= List of most expensive coins =

The following list is a chart of the most expensive coins. Most of these are auction prices, however, several private sale prices over $2m are yet or soon to be found amongst this list. Only the most recent sale is listed.

List of most expensive coins
Price	Year	Type	Grade	Issuing country	Provenance	Firm	Date of sale
$18,900,000	1933	1933 double eagle	MS-65 CAC	United States	King Farouk of Egypt	Sotheby's	June 8, 2021
$12,000,000	1794	Flowing Hair dollar	SP-66 CAC	United States	Neil, Carter	Private sale	January 27, 2022
$9,360,000	1787	Brasher Doubloon - EB on Wing	MS-65 CAC	privately minted	Stickney, Ellsworth, Garrett, Partrick	Heritage Auctions	January 21, 2021
$8,400,000	1822	Half Eagle	AU-50	United States	Virgil Brand, Horace and Armin Brand, Louis E. Eliasberg, Sr. and Jr., D. Brent Pogue	Stack's Bowers	March 25, 2021
$7,680,000	1804	1804 dollar	PR-68	United States	Sultan of Muscat, Charles A. Watters, Virgil M. Brand, Childs, Pogue	Stack's Bowers	May 10, 2026
$7,500,000	1894	Double Dragon Longevity Tael		Qing China		Shanghai Hosane Auction	May 10, 2026
$7,395,000	1787	Brasher Doubloon - EB on Breast	AU-50	privately minted		Blanchard and Company (private transaction)	December 2011
$7,200,000	1861	Paquet Liberty Head double eagle	MS-67 CAC	United States	Norweb	Heritage Auctions	August 18, 2021
$6,900,000	1903	Fengtien Tael		China		Beijing Chengxuan Auction	August 12, 2022
$6,600,000	1794	Flowing Hair dollar	MS-66+ CAC	United States	Lord St. Oswald, Hayes, Pogue	Heritage Auctions	August 18, 2021
$6,029,400	723	Gold dinar of Yazid II		Umayyad Caliphate		Morten & Eden	April 2011
$6,000,000	1804	1804 dollar	PR-65 CAC	United States	James A. Stack,Sr	Stack's Bowers	December 2025
$5,520,000	1870	Three-dollar piece		United States	San Francisco Mint	Heritage Auctions	January 2023
$5,500,000	1787	Brasher Doubloon - EB on Wing	MS-63+	privately minted	Newlin, Davis, Perschke	Heritage Auctions (private transaction)	March 2019
$5,280,000	1804	$10 Proof Eagle - DCAM	PR-65+ CAC	United States	Woodin, Col. Green, Simpson	Heritage Auctions	January 2021
$5,000,000	1913	1913 Liberty Head nickel - 5 cents	PR-66 CAC	United States	Eliasberg	Ronald J. Gillio (private transaction)	April 2007
$4,880,000	1911	Short Whiskered Dragon Dollar		China		Heritage Auctions	June 17, 2026
$4,780,000	723	Gold dinar of Yazid II		Umayyad Caliphate		Morten & Eden	October 2019
$4,750,000	1907	Saint-Gaudens double eagle - Ultra High Relief	PR-68 CAC	United States	Bell, Hein, Simpson	Private sale	December 13, 2021
$4,500,000	1794	Flowing Hair Dollar	MS-63+ CAC	United States	Boyd, Cardinal	Stack's Bowers	November 11, 2025
$4,174,950	42 BC	Aureus of Marcus Junius Brutus		Roman Republic		Roma Numismatics Limited	October 2020
$4,070,000	2007	$1 Million Canadian Gold Maple Leaf		Canada		Dorotheum Auction House	June 2010
$4,000,000 (20 million ZAR)	1898	"Single 9" Pond		South African Republic	King Farouk of Egypt	South Cape Coins (private transaction)	May 2010
$3,960,000	1885	Trade Dollar	PF-66	United States	Eliasberg	Heritage Auctions	January 2019
$3,877,500	1804	Bust Dollar - Class I	PR-62	United States	Mickley, Hawn, Queller	Heritage Auctions	August 2013
$3,600,000	1873	1873 No Arrows Seated Liberty dime	PR-66	United States	The Prestwick Collection	Heritage Auctions	January 2023
$3,360,000	1804	Bust Dollar - Class I	PR-65	United States	Stickney, Eliasberg	Stack's Bowers	December 17, 2020
$3,360,000	1795	$10 Gold "Turban Head" Eagle, 9 Leaves	MS-63+	United States	Pogue	Heritage Auctions	January 13, 2022
$3,290,000	1804	Bust Dollar - Class I	PR-65	United States	Dexter	Sotheby's/Stack's Bowers	March 2017
$3,290,000	1913	1913 Liberty Head nickel	PF-64 CAC	United States	Hawaii Five-O	Heritage Auctions	January 2014
$3,172,500	1913	1913 Liberty Head nickel	PR-63	United States	George O. Walton	Heritage Auctions	April 2013
$3,090,000	1927-D	Saint-Gaudens double eagle	MS-66+ CAC	United States	Eliasberg	Private sale	August 6, 2021
$3,000,000	1911	Long Whisker Dragon Dollar	SP-63+	China		Stack's Bowers	
$2,990,000	1907	Saint-Gaudens double eagle - Ultra High Relief	PR-69	United States	Trompeter	Heritage Auctions	November 2005
$2,990,000	1787	Brasher Doubloon - EB Punch on Breast	XF-45	privately minted		Heritage Auctions	January 2005
$2,918,000	409 - 406 BC	Decadrachm		Agrigentum		Numismatica Ars Classica	October 2012
$2,820,000	1794	Flowing Hair dollar	MS-64 CAC	United States	Norweb	Stack's Bowers	August 2017
$2,711,250	1795	Capped Bust Gold Eagle	MS-63+ CAC	United States		GreatCollections	May 2023
$2,640,000	1825	Constantine ruble		Russian Empire		Stack's Bowers	April 6, 2021
$2,585,000	1792	Birch Cent	MS-65 CAC	United States	Garrett, Partrick	Heritage Auctions	January 2015
$2,585,000	1795	$10 Capped Bust Right Eagle - 13 leaves	MS-66+	United States	Garrett	Sotheby's/Stack's Bowers	September 2015
$2,574,000	1880	$4 Coiled Hair		United States		Bonhams	September 2013
$2,415,000	1787	Brasher Doubloon - EB on Wing		privately minted		Heritage Auctions	January 2015
$2,400,000	1854-S	$5	XF45	United States		Heritage Auctions	August 18, 2021
$2,350,000	1808	Quarter eagle		United States		Sotheby's/Stack's Bowers	April 20, 2015
$2,350,000	1793	1793 Cent Chain S-4		United States		Heritage Auctions	January 2015
$2,300,000	1804	Bust Dollar		United States	Adams, Carter	Heritage Auctions	April 2009
$2,280,000	1928	Dollar Pattern		China		Stack's Bowers	April 6, 2021
$2,242,000	1621	100 ducat of Sigismund III Vasa		Poland–Lithuania		Oslo Myntgalleri AS	May 10, 2025
$2,280,000	1937	Edward VIII 5 Pounds Pattern		United Kingdom		Heritage Auctions	March 2021
$2,232,500	1792	pattern Quarter dollar		United States	Donald G. Partrick	Heritage Auctions	January 2015
$2,185,000	1907	Eagle - Rolled Edge		United States		Heritage Auctions	January 2011
$2,160,000	1621	100 ducat of Sigismund III Vasa		Poland–Lithuania	Kroisos	Classical Numismatic Group	January 2018
$2,160,000	1796	Quarter Eagle, No Stars	MS-62+	United States	Simpson, Bass, Dannreuther	Heritage Auctions	January 2022
$2,160,000	1927-D	Saint-Gaudens double eagle		United States	Dr. Steven Duckor	Heritage Auctions	January 2020
$2,160,000	1854-S	$5 Liberty Half Eagle		United States		Heritage Auctions	August 2018
$2,160,000	1928	Pattern "Mukden Tiger" Dollar		China		Heritage Auctions	December 2021
$2,115,000	1907	$20 Ultra High Relief LE		United States		Heritage Auctions	January 2015
$2,086,875	1893-S	1893-S Morgan dollar	MS-67 CAC	United States		GreatCollections	August 2021
$2,000,000	1921	$20	PR-64+	United States		Heritage Auctions	August 2021
$1,997,500	1894-S	Barber Dime		United States	Clapp, Eliasberg, Richmond	Heritage Auctions	January 2016
$1,997,500	1927	$20		United States	Duckor	Heritage Auctions	January 2014
$1,997,500	1792	Silver Center J-1 Pattern		United States	Norweb	Heritage Auctions	August 2014
$1,980,000	1874	Bickford $10 Pattern	PR-65+	United States	Simpson	Heritage Auctions	January 2022
$1,920,000	ca. 1588	Hishi Oban (10 Ryo)	MS-60	Japan	Pinnacle	Stack's Bowers	April 2021
$1,897,500	1927	$20		United States	Morse	Heritage Auctions	November 2005
$1,880,000	1804	Class III Silver Dollar		United States	Berg, Garrett	Stack's Bowers	August 2014
$1,880,000	1879	Quintuple Stella J-1643 Pattern		United States	Carter, Trompeter	Legend	May 2016
$1,840,000	1804	Class I Silver Dollar		United States		Stack's Bowers	October 2000
$1,840,000	1913	Liberty Head 5C		United States		Superior	March 2008
$1,821,250	1880	$4 Coiled Hair		United States	Dupont	Heritage Auctions	April 2015
$1,800,000	1861	$20	PR-66	United States	Simpson	Heritage Auctions	January 2022
$1,740,000	1792	Washington $10 Prefed		United States	Newman	Heritage Auctions	August 2018
$1,740,000	1796	Flowing Hair Quarter	MS-66	United States	Foxfire, Simpson	Heritage Auctions	January 2022
$1,725,000	1920	$10		United States	Forgue, Blackwell, Duckor	Heritage Auctions	March 2007
$1,725,000	1796	No Stars $2.50		United States	Parmelee, Brock, Ward, Rogers	Heritage Auctions	January 2008
$1,648,805	135 - 136 AD	Sestertius of Hadrian		Roman Empire		Numismatica Genevensis SA	December 2008
$1,645,000	1861	Paquet $20		United States	Dallas Bank Specimen	Heritage Auctions	August 2014
$1,620,000	1870-CC	$20	AU-53	United States		Heritage Auctions	November 2021
$1,610,000	1861	Paquet $20		United States	Dallas Bank Specimen	Heritage Auctions	August 2006
$1,610,000	1839/8	Type of 1838 LL $10		United States	Parmelee, Clapp, Eliasberg	Heritage Auctions	January 2007
$1,567,190	1991	Gold 10000 Yuan		China		Taisei Coins Corporation	April, 2011
$1,552,500	1894	10C		United States	Kagin's (1984)	Stack's Bowers	October 2007
$1,527,500	1776	Continental Silver N-3D Prefed		United States	Boyd, Ford, Partrick	Heritage Auctions	January 2015
$1,527,500	1797	O-101a 50C		United States	Brand, Curtis, Hepner, Rogers	Sotheby's/Stack's Bowers	May 2015
$1,527,500	1796	B-2 25C		United States	Green, Newman	Heritage Auctions	November 2013
$1,527,500	1776	Continental Silver N-1C Prefed		United States	Seavey, Ford, Garrett, Partrick	Heritage Auctions	January 2015
$1,527,500	1796	B-2 25C		United States	Ten Eyck, Holmes	Sotheby's/Stack's Bowers	May 2015
$1,500,000	1793	Chain S-1 1C		United States	Seitz, Naftzger, Weinberg	Heritage Auctions	January 2019
$1,495,000	1927	$20		United States	Ralph Muller Collection	Heritage Auctions	January 2010
$1,495,000	1921	$20		United States		Bowers Merena	August 2006
$1,485,000	1913	Liberty Head 5C		United States	Eliasberg	Bowers Merena	May 1996
$1,440,000	1839	5 Pounds, Victoria	PR-66*	United Kingdom		Heritage Auctions	August 2021
$1,437,500	1856	$20		United States	Eagle Collection	Heritage Auctions	May 2009
$1,410,000	1792	Silver Center J-1 Pattern		United States	Boyd, Newman	Heritage Auctions	May 2014
$1,410,000	1776	Continental Silver N-3D Prefed		United States	Earle, Newcomer, Green, Newman	Heritage Auctions	May 2014
$1,410,000	1792	Half Disme J-7 Pattern		United States	Floyd Starr	Heritage Auctions	January 2013
$1,380,000	1587-1632	Sigismund III		Poland–Lithuania	Poland Kingdom	Stack's Bowers	January 2008
$1,380,000	1793	Chain S-4 1C		United States	Cleneay, Atwater, Eliasberg	Heritage Auctions	January 2012
$1,380,000	1829	Large Date $5		United States	Garrett	Heritage Auctions	January 2012
$1,380,000	1797	O-101a 50C		United States	Norweb	Stack's Bowers	July 2008
$1,380,000	1796	No Stars $2.50		United States	Parmelee, Brock, Ward, Rogers	ANR	June 2005
$1,351,250	1833	Large Date $5		United States	King Farouk of Egypt, Pittman	Sotheby's/Stack's Bowers	May 2016
$1,322,500	1792	Half Disme J-7 Pattern		United States	Floyd Starr	Heritage Auctions	April 2006
$1,322,500	1894	10C		United States	James Stack	DLRC	March 2005
$1,322,500	1927	$20		United States	Primary Bartle	Heritage Auctions	January 2006
$1,322,500	1855	$3		United States	Sierra Foothills Estate	Heritage Auctions	August 2011
$1,320,000	1894	10C		United States	Dr. Jerry Buss	Stack's Bowers	August 2019
$1,298,000	1992	Gold 2000 Yuan		China		Champion Auctions Hong Kong	August 2011
$1,292,500	1792	Half Disme J-7 Pattern		United States	Floyd Starr	Heritage Auctions	August 2014
$1,292,500	1927	$20		United States	Kramer, Richmond	Heritage Auctions	March 2014
$1,292,500	1797	O-101a 50C		United States	Norweb	Heritage Auctions	August 2014
$1,265,000	1795	Flowing Hair Silver Dollar		United States	Bullowa	Bullowa	December 2005
$1,265,000	1795	Reeded Edge 1C		United States	Holmes	Goldberg	September 2009
$1,265,000	1874	Bickford $10 J-1373 Pattern		United States	Judd, Wilkison	Heritage Auctions	January 2010
$1,260,000	1792	White Metal Pattern Quarter	AU-58	United States		Heritage Auctions	April 2021
$1,210,000	1907	Ultra High Relief LE $20		United States	Norweb	Goldberg	May 1999
$1,207,500	1866	No Motto Silver Dollar		United States	Wolfson, Jay, Delp	ANR	January 2005
$1,207,500	1804	Class III Silver Dollar		United States	Carter, Flannagan	Bowers & Merena	July 2003
$1,200,000	1911	Hsüan-t'ung Dollar Pattern	PR-63	China		Heritage Auctions	December 2021
$1,175,000	1792	Birch Cent J-4 Pattern		United States	Bushnell, Parmelee, Jenks, Green	Stack's Bowers	March 2015
$1,175,000	1783	Nova Constellatio Quint Prefed		United States	Crosby, Parmelee, Ellsworth, Garrett	Heritage Auctions	April 2013
$1,175,000	1798	Small Eagle BD-1 $5		United States	King Farouk of Egypt	Sotheby's/Stack's Bowers	September 2015
$1,175,000	1796	SD, SL BB-63 Silver Dollar		United States	William Jacob Collection	Heritage Auctions	April 2013
$1,170,000	1792	10c	SP-64	United States	Garrett-Simpson	Heritage Auctions	January 2022
$1,150,000	1794	C-7 H1C		United States	Fred Weinberg	Goldberg	January 2014
$1,150,000	1792	Silver Center J-1 Pattern		United States	Morris Specimen	Heritage Auctions	April 2012
$1,145,625	1792	Half Disme J-7 Pattern		United States	Knoxville, Cardinal	Stack's Bowers	January 2013
$1,140,000	1884	Trade Dollar		United States	Granberg, Brand, Eliasberg	Heritage Auctions	January 2019
$1,140,000	1776	Continental Dollar	VF-35	United States		Heritage Auctions	April 2021
$1,121,250	1811	C-1 H1C		United States	Hall, Brand, Newman, Tett	Goldberg	January 2014
$1,105,375	66-70 AD	AR shekel from Arwad (24mm, 13.34 gm, 10h)		Roman Empire	Jewish War	Heritage Auctions	March 2012
$1,092,500	1921	$20		United States	Crawford, Morse	Heritage Auctions	November 2005
$1,092,500	1870	Silver Dollar		United States		Stack's Bowers	May 2003
$1,057,500	1792	pattern Disme		United States		Heritage Auctions	January 2015
$1,057,500	1795	Nine Leaves BD-3 $10		United States	Auction '89	Sotheby's/Stack's Bowers	September 2015
$1,057,500	1852	Humber $10 K-10 Territorial		United States	Augustus Humbert	Heritage Auctions	April 2013
$1,057,500	1795	BB-51 Draped Bust Silver Dollar		United States	Garrett	Sotheby's/Stack's Bowers	May 2016
$1,057,500	1792	Disme J-11 Pattern		United States	Garrett, Partrick	Heritage Auctions	January 2015
$1,057,500	1907	Ultra High Relief LE $20		United States	Morrison/Licht Collections	Heritage Auctions	August 2012
$1,050,000	1879	$4 Coiled Hair		United States	Memorable Sale; Spectrum	Heritage Auctions	January 2019
$1,050,000	1866	Seated Dollar, No Motto	PR-63+	United States	Simpson	Heritage Auctions	April 2021
$1,041,300	1879	$4 Coiled Hair		United States	Gold Rush Collection	Bonhams	September 2013
$1,035,000	1894	10c		United States	Daggett, Parker, World-Wide	Heritage Auctions	January 2005
$1,020,000	1863	$20	PR-65+	United States	Eliasberg	Heritage Auctions	May 2022
$1,012,000	1921	$20		United States	Hesselgesser	Goldberg	September 2007
$1,006,250	1796	With Stars $2.50		United States	Byron Reed	Heritage Auctions	January 2008
$1,006,250	1885	Trade Dollar		United States	Norweb	DLRC	November 2004
