= Gerald Forsythe =

American businessman

Gerald (Jerry) R. Forsythe (born in Marshall, Illinois in 1942) is an American businessman and auto racing magnate, best known for being one of the three men (Kevin Kalkhoven and Paul Gentilozzi are the other two) that owned the Champ Car World Series. Forsythe also owned a racing team, Forsythe Championship Racing, that competed in the Champ Car series. In the area of numismatics, Jerry Forsythe is known for owning the finest 1913 Liberty Head nickel and the number one ranked sets for mint state and proof Liberty Nickels as ranked in the PCGS Set Registry.

== Auto racing ==
Forsythe began his career as a car owner in 1983. His team, Forsythe Racing, fielded an entry for Italian rookie Teo Fabi in the CART PPG Indy Car World series. Fabi made an impressive showing, winning four races and six poles (including that for the Indianapolis 500) and finishing second in the series points standings. In 1985, Forsythe sold his team in order to concentrate on the development of his other businesses.

In 1993, Forsythe returned to auto racing, teaming with Barry Green to form the Forsythe/Green Racing team in the Toyota Atlantic Championship, a developmental series for CART. Backed by Canadian tobacco company Player's, Ltd., the team's two drivers, Canadians Claude Bourbonnais and future Formula One World champion Jacques Villeneuve, finished second and third in the points standings, respectively. In 1994, the team graduated to the Indy Car World Series, with Villeneuve behind the wheel. The French-Canadian had an immensely successful season, winning Rookie of the Year honors.

In 1995, Forsythe returned to full ownership of a race team and retained Player's as his sponsor. At the end of that season, he opted to join Championship Auto Racing Teams (CART) over Tony George's Indy Racing League when the Indy Car series split as a result of a bitter dispute between George and CART executives. Since that time, several notable drivers (mostly Canadians) have driven for him, including Greg Moore, Patrick Carpentier, Alex Tagliani, Paul Tracy and A. J. Allmendinger. The team had the most successful season in its history in 2003, with Tracy winning seven races en route to capturing the last-ever CART championship. After the 2003 campaign, Forsythe pooled resources with fellow team owners Kevin Kalkhoven and Paul Gentilozzi to purchase CART's liquidated assets and create the Champ Car World Series. His team, now known as Forsythe Championship Racing (after losing Player's as a sponsor due to Canadian anti-tobacco legislation), promptly joined the new series. Shortly afterwards, he and his partners purchased CART's sole engine supplier, Cosworth. In 2006 Forsythe and Kalkhoven formed the Grand Prix Association of Toronto to purchase control of the Molson Indy Toronto, one of Champ Car's marquee races, from Molson, as well as Long Beach Grand Prix. On March 28, 2024, Forsythe announced he would consolidate his ownership of the Long Beach Grand Prix, by purchasing the remaining 50% from Kalkhoven's estate.

In 1999, Forsythe expanded into track ownership, acquiring facilities in Monterrey and Mexico City, Mexico in partnership with CIE, as well as purchasing a stake in the Rockingham Motor Speedway in Corby, England.

During the Champ Car/IRL merger in early 2008, Forsythe planned to merge his team with former RuSPORT owner Dan Pettit to form Forsythe/Pettit Racing, however Forysthe elected to fold his team rather than race in the merged series. His reason for not competing was "lack of sponsorship." However, given his financial status his decision seems questionable. Sources point to his long-standing feud with Tony George (Indianapolis Motor Speedway President and founder of the IRL) as the true reason for not competing in the new IndyCar Series.

== Numismatics ==
Jerry Forsythe is known for owning the finest 1913 Liberty Head nickel, often known as the Eliasberg Specimen, for the financier Louis E. Eliasberg, as part of his top ranked mint state and proof Liberty Head nickel sets.

In terms of coin collecting, he is known to have Shield nickels, Liberty Head nickels, Buffalo nickels, Mercury dimes, Walking Liberty half dollars, and Indian Head $10 gold coins. For his Buffalo nickel collection and Walking Liberty half dollars collection, he was awarded a PCGS Set Registry Platinum Award. In addition, he was able to bag a PCGS Set Registry Gold Award for his Liberty Head nickels, Mercury dimes, and Indian Head $10 gold collection.

In 2019, PCGS credits Forsythe as a "distinguished numismatist" and the designer of the PCGS Rarities Holder.

== Outside racing and numismatics ==
Forsythe is the chief shareholder in, and chairman and CEO of, the Indeck Companies, which include Indeck Power Equipment Company, Indeck Energy Services, Inc., and Indeck Operations. Indeck Power Equipment specializes in the rental, lease, and sale of steam power, while Indeck Energy Services, Inc. develops, owns, and operates cogeneration and independent power projects in North America. Indeck Operations manages the company's plants, as well as those of other firms. The Indeck logo was prominently featured on the sides of the blue Champ Cars that were owned by Forsythe before opting not to run in the unified IndyCar Series in 2008.

Forsythe is also active in cattle ranching and farming, and maintains a farm in his native Marshall, Illinois.

In 2008, Forsythe built a private residence in Inverness, Illinois measuring 24,884 square feet, the largest single family residence in Cook County, Illinois at the time of its building.

On July 31, 2009, Forsythe purchased Garland Resort in Lewiston, Michigan. Garland is a 3,000-acre (12 km^{2}) resort with four 18 hole courses and the largest log lodge east of the Mississippi River.

During 2011, Forsythe purchased Blue Harbor Resort in Sheboygan, Wisconsin. Blue Harbor Resort, a classic lakeside resort and spa, is the largest resort on Lake Michigan. Modeled in the style of the Hotel del Coronado in San Diego, the resort offers hotel rooms and condos in 11 different configurations for rent. The main attraction of the resort is the 54,000 sq. ft. indoor water park open year around.

=== Political activities ===
Forsythe contributed to Donald Trump's 2020 reelection campaign, although the filing misspelled his name.
