= Harvey G. Stack =

American numismatist (1928–2022)

Harvey Stack
- Born: June 3, 1928; New York, New York, U.S.
- Died: January 3, 2022 (aged 93)
- Occupation: Numismatist
- Years active: 1947-2022
- Known for: Businessman, numismatist

Harvey G. Stack (June 3, 1928 – January 3, 2022) was an American numismatist. He was the proprietor of his family rare coin firm Stack's and its successor, Stack's Bowers Galleries, one of the most prominent coin retailers. He died on January 3, 2022, at the age of 93.

== Early life ==
Stack was born in Manhattan, and grew up in the Bronx and Jamaica, Queens. He graduated from New York University, and began working at his father's coin firm in 1947.

== Career ==
In the 1960s, Stack helped build the collections of Josiah K. Lilly, which was donated to the National Numismatic Collection at the Smithsonian Museum of American History following Lilly's death in 1966, and Louis E. Eliasberg, who accumulated the only complete collection of American coins prior to his death in 1976.

He testified before the United States Congress in 1973 in favor of the Hobby Protection Act of 1973, which required replicas of coins to be "marked with certain identifying information in an effort to flag them as imitations'. He played a key role in pushing the American Numismatic Association to adopt the Sheldon Grading Scale in the 1970s.

Stack served on the board of the Professional Numismatists Guild for almost a decade, including as president from 1989 to 1991, and worked with the American Numismatic Association to develop the standardized grading system in use today. In 1996, he again testified before Congress, this time the House Banking Committee, to propose the 50 State Quarters Program.

== Personal life ==
Stack was married to Harriet Spellman, and they had two children.
