= Blanchard and Company =

American precious metal investment company

Blanchard and Company, Inc.
- Type: Private company
- Industry: Precious metals
- Founded: 1975; 51 years ago
- Founders: James "Jim" U. Blanchard III
- Headquarters: New Orleans, Louisiana, United States
- Key people: Donald W. Doyle, Jr. (Chairman), David Beahm (President & CEO)
- Products: Gold coins and gold bars Silver coins and silver bars
- Website: www.blanchardgold.com

Blanchard and Company is an American investment firm specializing in rare coins and precious metals, including gold bars, silver coins and bars, platinum, and palladium.

== History ==
Blanchard was founded in 1975 by James "Jim" U. Blanchard III, one year after President Gerald Ford legalized ownership of gold by private citizens. Americans had not been able to privately own gold since 1933, when President Franklin D. Roosevelt signed Executive Order 6102.

President Ford, who did not realize private ownership of gold was a felony, was motivated to legalize gold after seeing a television commercial of Blanchard in his wheelchair, holding a bar of gold and asking, “Why can I not own this?”. Blanchard had also hired an airplane to fly over President Nixon's second inauguration with a banner reading “Legalize Gold.”

After legalization, Jim Blanchard was a prominent figure in America's gold industry, founding an influential newsletter called Gold Newsletter, publishing a memoir called Confessions of a Gold Bug, and founding one of the investment industry's longest-running conferences, now known as the New Orleans Investment Conference, which has included speakers such as Margaret Thatcher, Milton Friedman, F.A. Hayek, Ayn Rand, and Ed Crane. Blanchard also served on the Cato Institute’s Board of Directors.

In 1987, Allegiance Capital Partners and GE Capital Corp. purchased Blanchard and Company, Inc. At the time, Blanchard and Company, Inc.’s annual sales totaled $115 million. Donald W. Doyle, Jr. purchased Blanchard and Company, Inc. on October 5, 1991.

In 1999, Blanchard partnered with John Albanese, founder of Certified Acceptance Corporation and the Numismatic Consumer Alliance, Inc., which exposes fraud and aids victims of numismatic fraud. Albanese selects Blanchard and Company, Inc.’s inventory.

== Notable transactions ==
- Shortly after partnering with Albanese, Blanchard and Company, Inc. placed the $20 Saint-Gaudens double eagle Ultra High Relief.
- In 2005, Blanchard and Company, Inc. placed the 1913 Liberty Head Nickel, which sold for $3 million.
- In 2011, Blanchard and Company, Inc. placed the 1787 gold Brasher Doubloon, the world's most valuable rare coin at the time. In a deal the company brokered, a Wall Street investment firm bought the coin for $7.4 million, one of the highest prices ever paid for a gold coin. Struck by a private goldsmith before the U.S. Mint existed, the coin is among rarest and most desirable of all U.S. coins.
- In 2016, Blanchard and Company, Inc. acquired coins from the Spanish 1715 Treasure Fleet shipwreck, one of the two primary dealerships to do so.
