= GreatCollections =

American auction house for certified coins and paper money

- Type: Private
- Founded: 2010; 16 years ago in Irvine, California, U.S.
- Founder: Ian Russell (founder/president); Raeleen Endo (co-founder)
- Headquarters: 17891 Cartwright Road, Irvine, California, U.S.
- Products: Certified coins and paper money
- Services: Auctioneer
- Website: greatcollections.com

GreatCollections is an American numismatic online auction house founded in 2010, and based in Irvine, California. The company is an auctioneer of certified rare coins and paper money.

== History ==
The auction house was co-founded Ian Russell, who serves as its president, and Raeleen Endo. They developed the company's website and operational infrastructure over a period of six months. Prior to founding the company, Russell had been president of Teletrade, Inc. and chief operating officer of Bowers and Merena Auctions; two of the largest coin auction houses in North America. Endo had previously worked at Professional Coin Grading Service (PCGS), and Collectors Universe.

The GreatCollections.com website launched in late 2010, facilitating the sale and purchase of coins and paper money in online auctions. It has since become well known for auctioning rare examples of American currency, such as the Cigarra Collection, and a collection of Indian Head nickels that sold for over $500,000.

GreatCollections auctioned a group of U.S. coins called the Turino Collection in March 2012. The collection included a 1907 Saint-Gaudens Gold Double Eagle that sold for $110,000, and a 1915-S Panama-Pacific Exposition $50 piece that sold for $79,750.

In July 2012, the company sold the only confirmed example of a Sacagawea dollar with edge lettering. In 2014, the company began selling "Capuano Everyman" sets of Morgan Dollars.

In 2015, talk show host Larry King interviewed Ian Russell about GreatCollections and coin collecting. GreatCollections expanded into a larger facility in Irvine, nearer to PCGS headquarters, in August 2015.

In November 2021, GreatCollections acquired the finest graded 1913 Liberty Head Nickel. The nickel is one of the most well known rarities in American numismatics, with only five examples known. The example acquired by the company was previously a centerpiece of the Eliasberg Collection. It last traded at auction for $4.56 million in 2018.

In January 2022, GreatCollections acquired the first U.S. Silver Dollar for $12 Million. The company became the official auctioneer of the American Numismatic Association in March 2022. Later that year, the auction house loaned four coins to the Central States Numismatic Society for a special exhibition in Schaumburg, Illinois. In August, GreatCollections auctioned ten 100-year-old pennies for $1.1 million. The pennies were specially struck proof coins made for collectors by the United States' Philadelphia Mint, in the early years of the Lincoln cents.

GreatCollections relocated within Irvine once more in August 2023, now in a dedicated building eight times the size of its previous location.

In October 2024, GreatCollections auctioned an extremely rare 1975 No "S" Dime for just over $500,000. The coin was struck by the U.S. Mint in San Francisco, and is one of just two known proof coins to exist without its distinctive "S" mint mark.

GreatCollections has graded the two highest value coins in history; the 1933 Saint-Gaudens Double Eagle valued at $19 million, and the "Gold Cas", the 1000 BTC Casascius Physical Bitcoin valued at $48 million.
