= Stack's Bowers =

American auction house

Stack's Bowers Galleries
- Type: Private
- Industry: Auction
- Founded: 1933; 92 years ago in New York City, New York
- Headquarters: Costa Mesa, California
- Products: Collectible coins and paper money
- Website: https://stacksbowers.com

Stack’s Bowers, also known as Stack's Bowers Galleries, is an American auction house headquartered in Costa Mesa, California that specializes in the sale of rare coins and paper money. The firm was founded in 1933 in New York City and held its first auction on October 15, 1935, making it the oldest operating numismatic auction house in the United States.

== History ==
The company was founded as Stack's Rare Coins in 1933 in New York City by brothers Joseph and Morton Stack. Their grandfather Maurice had started a foreign exchange house in 1858 and eventually operated a side business dealing in coins and stamps. Stack's Rare Coins held its first numismatic auction in 1935. Harvey G. Stack, son of Morton Stack, joined the firm in 1947. Six years later, the company moved to 123 West 57th Street, after it had been at locations on Sixth Avenue and 46th Street in Manhattan since its founding. Stack's would continue to operate at their office on West 57th Street for 67 years before moving in 2020 to a different location on Park Avenue.

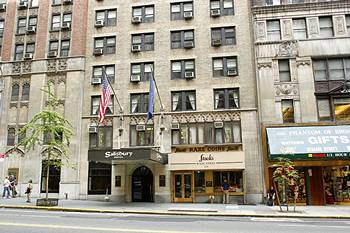
Stack's Rare Coins in 2005 on West 57th Street

In 2008, Stack's merged with American Numismatic Rarities. In 2011, the company subsequently merged with the auction house Bowers and Merena and started operating as Stack's Bowers Galleries. With this merger, noted numismatist and author Q. David Bowers joined the firm as its co-chairman. In February 2025, the parent group of Stack's Bowers, Spectrum Group International, was acquired by A-Mark Precious Metals for $92 million. For the fiscal year that ended on June 30, 2024 Stack’s Bowers Galleries had a total revenue of $536.4 million and a gross profit of $46.1 million. Stack's Bowers has offices worldwide, including in Copenhagen, Hong Kong, and Paris.

== Notable sales ==
- A 1794 Flowing Hair dollar was sold by Stack's Bowers in 2013 for $10,016,875, the first coin sold over $10 million.
- In seven sales between 2015 and 2017, Stack's Bowers sold the D. Brent Pogue collection of U.S. Coins, specializing in early American Federal coinage. The entire collection brought more than $131 million.
- In a series of sales held in 2018 and 2019 Stack's Bowers sold the Joel R. Anderson collection of United States Paper Money, which was the most valuable cabinet of U.S. paper money ever offered at auction. The collection brought more than $34 million.
- In August 2021, Stack's Bowers sold a Class I 1804 dollar coin graded Proof-68 by PCGS for $7.68 million. The coin had originally been part of a set gifted to Said bin Sultan, the Sultan of Muscat, in 1835.
- A Chinese Dragon Dollar prototype struck at the Tientsin mint in 1911 was sold in a Hong Kong auction in May 2022 for $3 million, one of the most expensive Chinese coins ever sold at auction.
- In 2024, Stack's Bowers started selling the coin collection of Lars Emil Bruun, a Danish magnate who had died in 1923. His will forbade his heirs from selling his collection for a century, in case that the Danish National Coin Collection was lost. The collection of 20,000 coins was insured for $72.5 million. The first set of coins sold at auction brought $16.5 million.
- An undated silver threepence struck in Boston in 1652 for the Massachusetts Bay Company sold by Stack's Bowers for $2.52 million in November 2024, an auction record for an American colonial coin. The coin had been found in an old cabinet in the Netherlands in 2016 and is one of only two known examples.
- An 1870 $2 Dominion of Canada banknote issued in Victoria, British Columbia brought $360,000 in January 2025, one of the highest prices ever paid for a Canadian banknote. The note was one of 24,000 printed but until its appearance in a Stack's Bowers auction none had ever been seen.
- In September 2025, Stack's Bowers was selected by the US Mint to sell seven space-flown gold Sacagawea Dollars, which had been on board the space shuttle Columbia in 1999. Along with an eight coin which did not fly in space, the auction brought a combined $3.28 million.
- The final circulating Lincoln Cents, identified by a small Omega symbol above the date, sold in December 2025 by Stack's Bowers for a total of $16.76 million. A total of 232 3-coin sets were sold, each set consisting of an example from the Philadelphia and Denver mints, along with a unique Philadelphia coin struck in 24-karat gold.

== See also ==
- List of most expensive coins
