= James U. Blanchard III =

American dealer in rare coins and precious metals (1943–1999)

Jim Blanchard
- Born: James U. Blanchard III; November 10, 1943; Greenwood, Mississippi, United States
- Died: March 19, 1999 (aged 55); Metairie, Louisiana, United States
- Education: University of New Orleans (1964–1968; B.A., 1968)
- Occupations: Teacher; lobbyist; author; businessman
- Known for: Legalization of gold
- Title: Founder and CEO of Blanchard and Company; Founder of National Committee to Legalize Gold (NCLG)
- Board member of: Cato Institute

James U. Blanchard III (November 10, 1943 – March 19, 1999) was an American dealer in rare coins and precious metals, active in the movement to legalize private gold holdings in the United States. He was the founder of Blanchard and Company, a precious metals investment firm.

== Early life ==
Blanchard was born on November 10, 1943, in Greenwood, Mississippi, and grew up in Houston, Texas. As a boy, he attended New Orleans Academy but was sent to Chamberlain-Hunt Academy, a historic Christian preparatory school, after misbehavior.

After a car accident that broke his back when he was a teenager, Blanchard was a paraplegic and used a wheelchair. He recuperated at Warm Springs, GA, the spa town President Franklin Roosevelt had often visited to treat his paraplegia.

Blanchard acquired his G.E.D. and in 1964 enrolled at what is now the University of New Orleans (UNO). It was during this period that he first read Ayn Rand, whom he admired, later naming his son after Rand's novella Anthem. He graduated with a major in history and taught for several years before founding the National Committee to Legalize Gold (NCLG). American citizens had not been able to privately own gold since 1933, when President Franklin Roosevelt signed Executive Order 6102.

== Career ==
Blanchard hired an airplane to fly over President Richard Nixon’s second inauguration with a banner that read "Legalize Gold." He also dared the Treasury Department to arrest him for owning a two-ounce bar of gold, and he displayed a gold coin smuggled into the U.S. from Canada at protests, daring the police to arrest him.

President Gerald Ford was persuaded to legalize gold after seeing a television commercial of Blanchard, who held a bar of gold and asked, "Why can I not own this?" Blanchard also successfully lobbied Congress for his cause.

After legalization of gold, Blanchard was a key figure in the U.S. gold industry. He founded an influential newsletter called Gold Newsletter, published a memoir titled Confessions of a Gold Bug, and founded the gold investment industry's longest-running conference, which has hosted speakers such as Margaret Thatcher, Milton Friedman, F.A. Hayek, Ayn Rand, and Ed Crane. Blanchard also served on the Cato Institute’s Board of Directors.

He died on March 19, 1999, age 55, in Metairie, Louisiana.
