= Saint-Gaudens double eagle =

US $20 Double Eagle coin (1907–1933)

Saint-Gaudens Double Eagle ($20)
- United States
- Value: 20 United States dollars
- Mass: 33.431 g
- Diameter: 34.1 mm (1.342 in)
- Thickness: 2.41 mm
- Edge: lettered "E PLURIBUS UNUM"
- Composition: 90% gold, 10% copper; 99.99% gold (2009)
- Gold: .96750 troy oz
- Years of minting: 1907–1933, 2009
- Mint marks: D, S. Found immediately above the date on the obverse. Philadelphia Mint specimens lack mint mark. W (2009)

Obverse
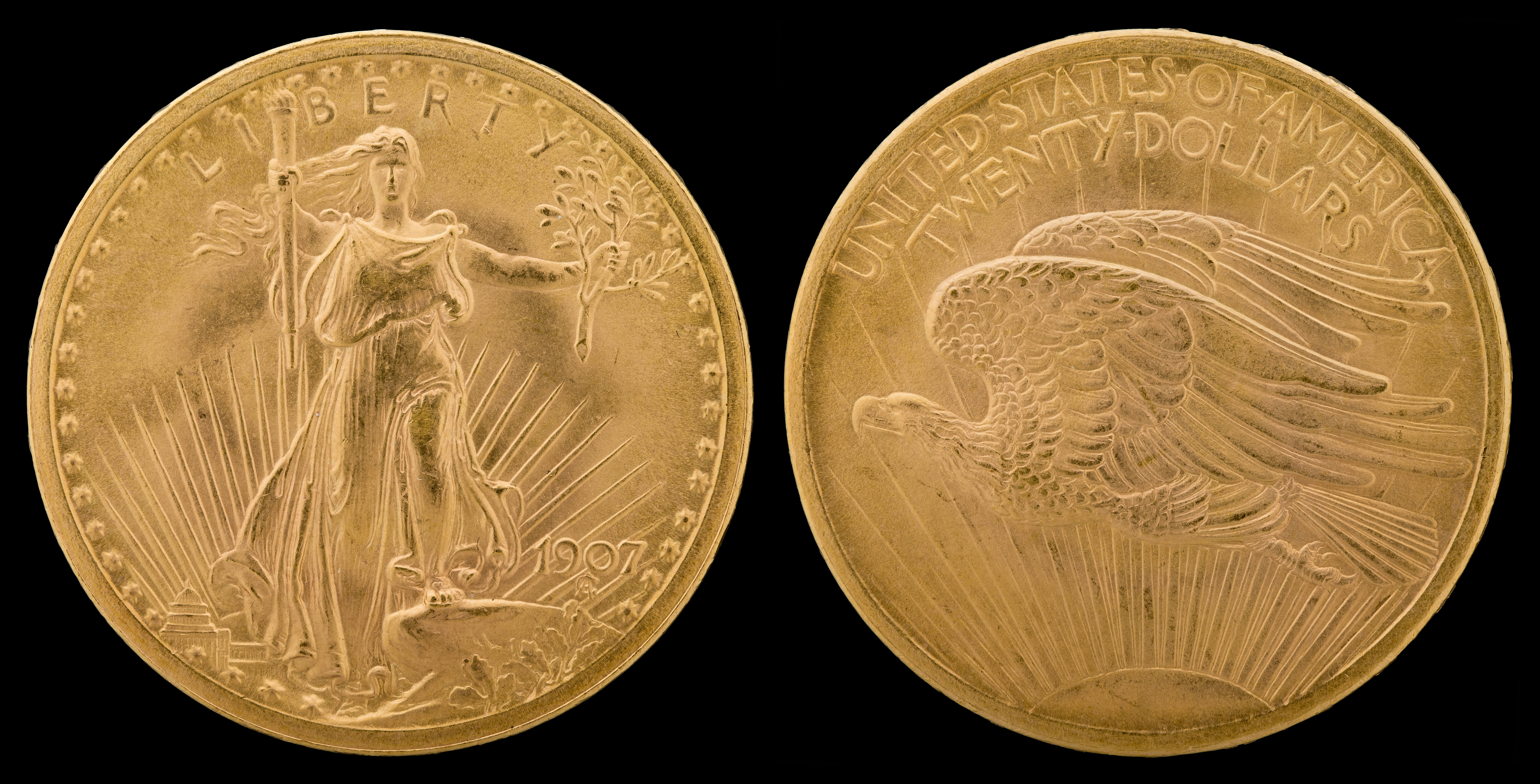
- Design: Liberty holding a torch and olive branch, backed by the rays of the Sun, the U.S. Capitol visible; 46 stars circle design
- Designer: Augustus Saint-Gaudens
- Design date: 1907
- Design discontinued: 1911
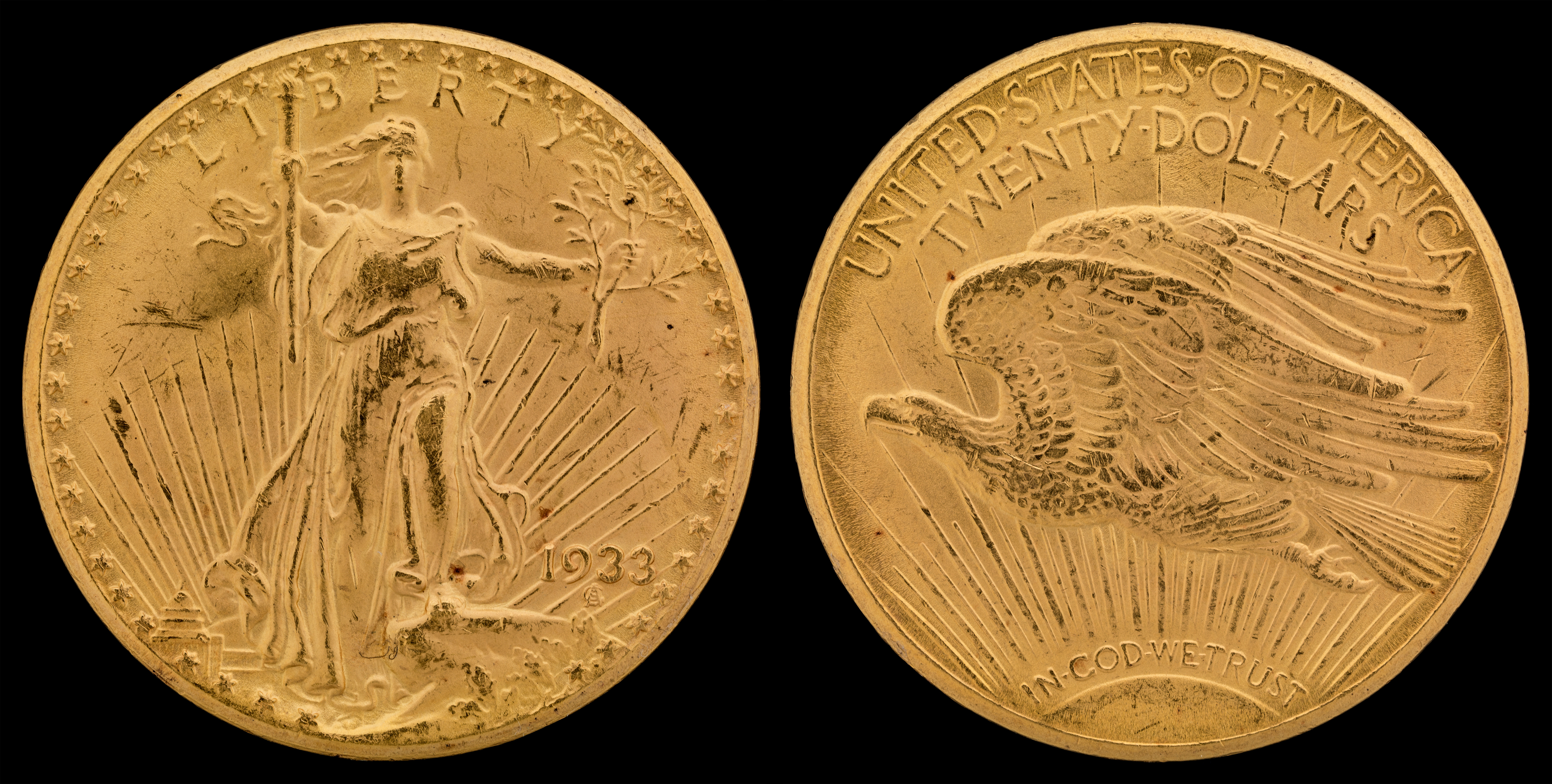
- Design: 48 stars
- Designer: Augustus Saint-Gaudens
- Design date: 1912
- Design discontinued: 1933

Reverse
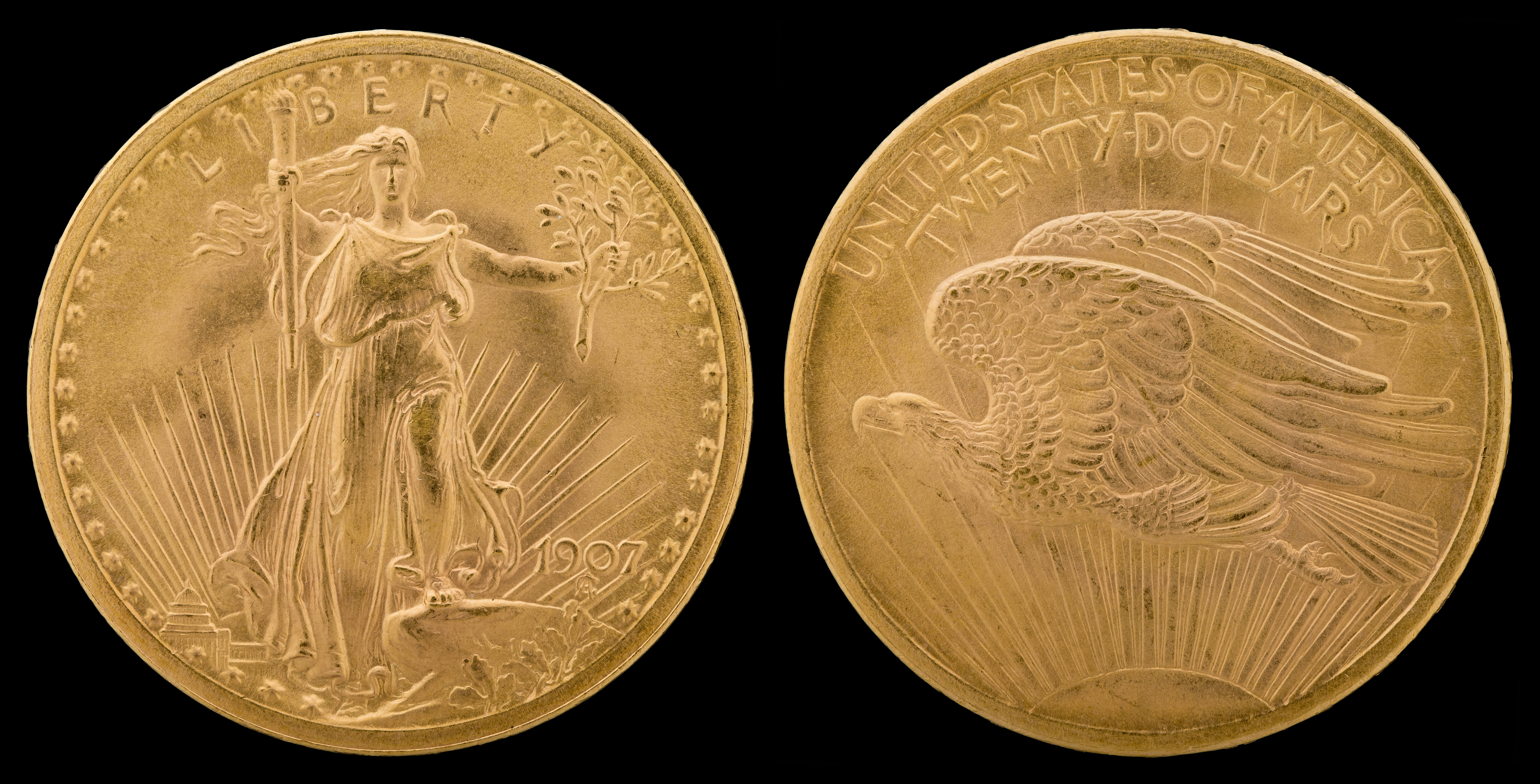
- Design: An eagle in flight, backed by rays from the Sun
- Designer: Augustus Saint-Gaudens
- Design date: 1907
- Design discontinued: 1908
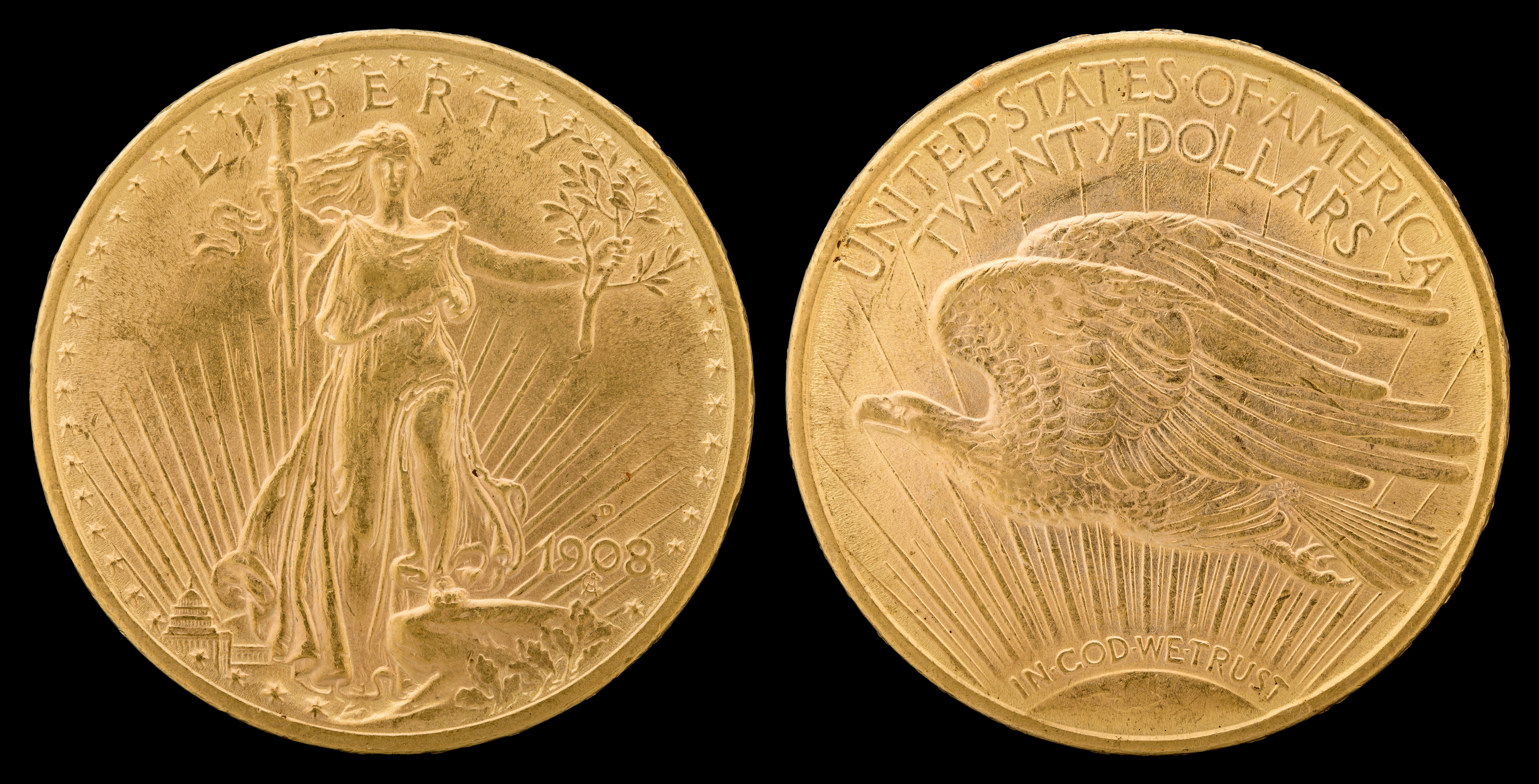
- Design: With "In God We Trust"
- Designer: Augustus Saint-Gaudens
- Design date: 1908
- Design discontinued: 1933

The Saint-Gaudens double eagle is a twenty-dollar gold coin, or double eagle, produced by the United States Mint from 1907 to 1933. The coin is named after its designer, the sculptor Augustus Saint-Gaudens, who designed the obverse and reverse. It is considered by many to be the most beautiful of U.S. coins.

In 1904, President Theodore Roosevelt sought to beautify American coinage, and proposed Saint-Gaudens as an artist capable of the task. Although the sculptor had poor experiences with the Mint and its chief engraver, Charles E. Barber, Saint-Gaudens accepted Roosevelt's call. The work was subject to considerable delays, due to Saint-Gaudens's declining health and difficulties because of the high relief of his design. Saint-Gaudens died in 1907, after designing the eagle and double eagle, but before the designs were finalized for production.

After several versions of the design for the double eagle proved too difficult to strike, Barber modified Saint-Gaudens's design, lowering the relief so the coin could be struck with only one blow. When the coins were finally released, they proved controversial as they lacked the words "In God We Trust", and Congress intervened to require the motto's use. The coin was minted, primarily for use in international trade, until 1933. The 1933 double eagle is among the most valuable of U.S. coins, with the sole example currently known to be in private hands selling in June 2021 for US$18.9 million.

== Background ==
The double eagle, or twenty-dollar gold piece, was first issued in 1850; its congressional authorization was a response to the increasing amount of gold available as the result of the California Gold Rush. The resulting Liberty Head double eagle, designed by Mint Engraver James Longacre, was struck for the remainder of the 19th century, though the design was modified several times. The double eagle, due to its very high face value, equivalent to several hundred dollars today, did not widely circulate, but was the coin most often used for large international transactions, in which settlement was to be in gold. In the West, where gold or silver coins were preferred to paper money—use of which was illegal in California in the aftermath of the Gold Rush—the coins saw some circulation.

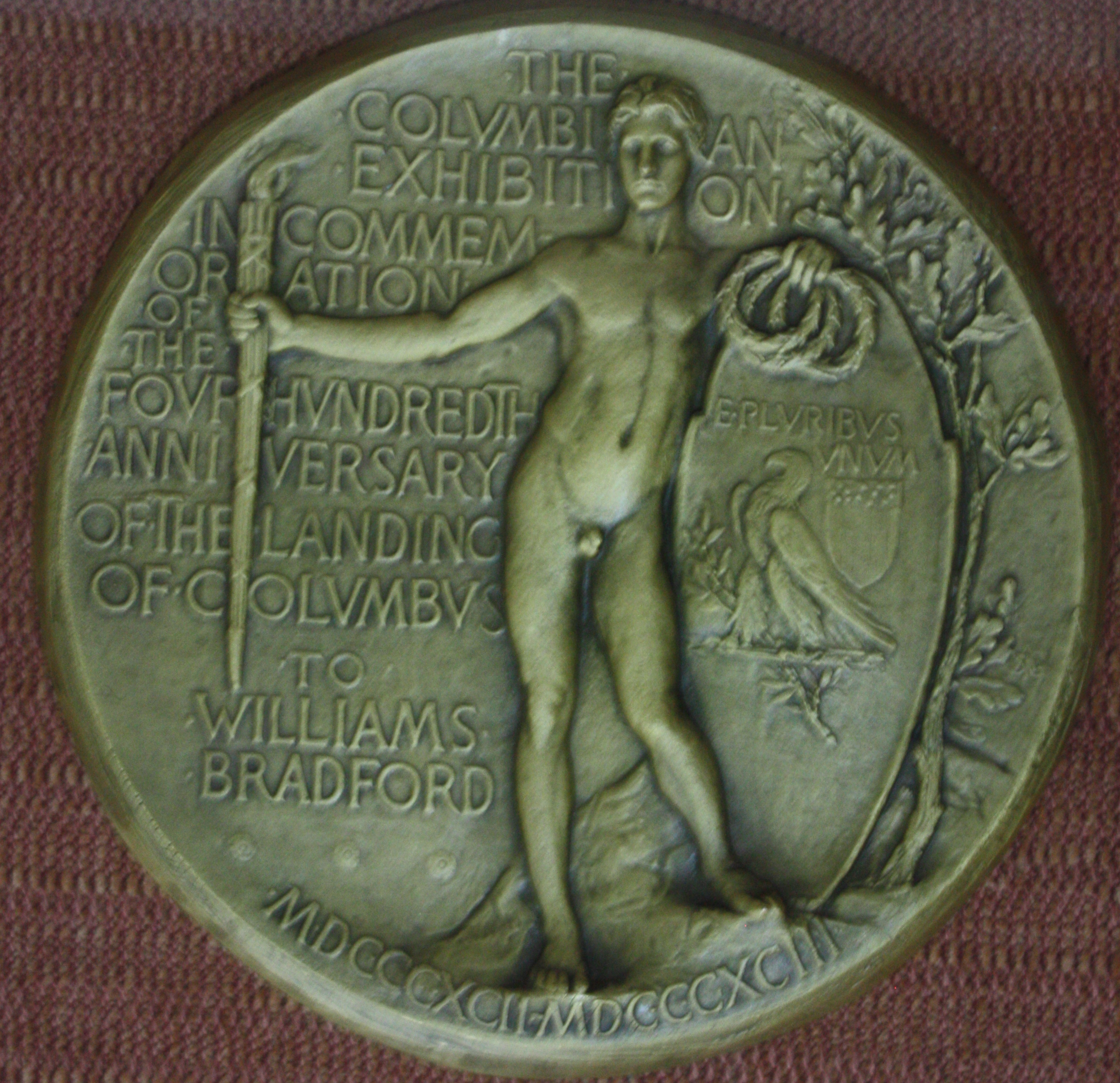
Saint-Gaudens's rejected reverse design for the World Columbian Exposition medal

Sculptor Augustus Saint-Gaudens's first association with the Mint was in 1891, when he served on a committee judging entries for the new silver coinage. The Mint had offered only a small prize to the winner, and all invited artists (including Saint-Gaudens himself) refused to submit entries. The competition was open to the public, and the judging committee (which consisted of Saint-Gaudens, Mint Engraver Charles E. Barber, and commercial engraver Henry Mitchell) found no entry suitable. This came as no surprise to Saint-Gaudens, who told Mint Director Edward O. Leech that there were only four men in the world capable of such work, of whom three were in France and Saint-Gaudens was the fourth. Barber, who had been Chief Engraver since 1879, felt that Saint-Gaudens overstated the case, and there was only one man capable of such coinage work—Barber himself. Leech responded to the failed competition by directing Barber to prepare new designs for the dime, quarter dollar, and half dollar, resulting in the Barber coinage, an issue which attracted considerable public dissatisfaction.

In 1892, Saint-Gaudens was asked to design the official medal of the World Columbian Exposition in Chicago; it would be presented to prizewinning exhibitors. The obverse of Saint-Gaudens's design, showing Columbus coming ashore, was noncontroversial; his reverse, which featured a torch-bearing naked youth carrying wreaths to crown the victors, was attacked by the censoring postal agent, Anthony Comstock, as obscene. The exposition directors hastily withdrew the reverse design and replaced it with one created by Barber which, according to numismatic historian Walter Breen, was "notable only for banality". A furious Saint-Gaudens swore to have nothing more to do with the Mint or its employees, and for the next decade refused all commissions which might involve him with that bureau.

== Inception ==
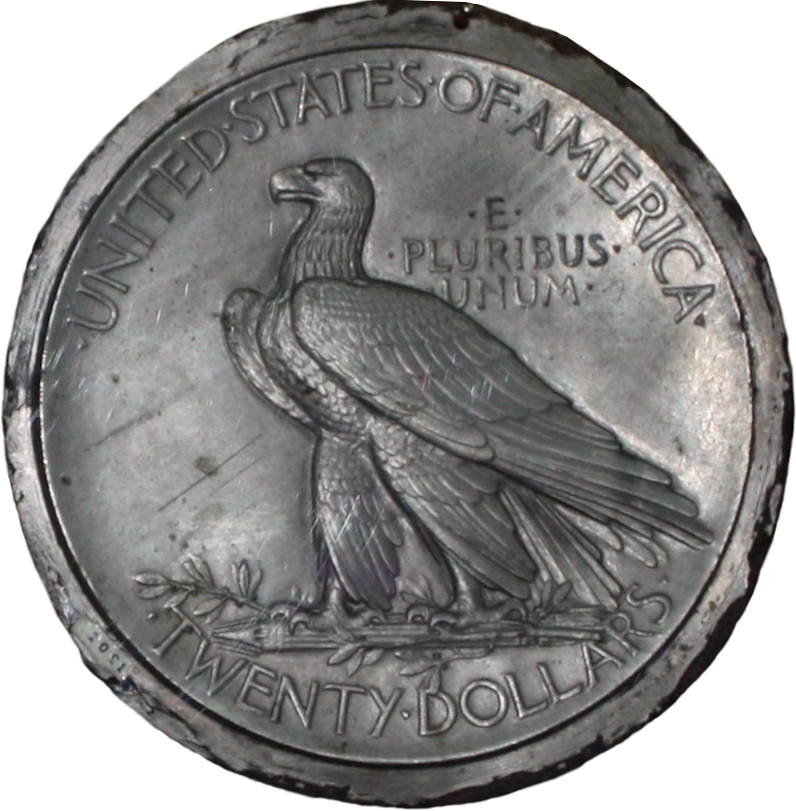
An early concept for the reverse of the double eagle by Saint-Gaudens; the design was adapted for the eagle.

On December 27, 1904, President Theodore Roosevelt, a personal friend of Saint-Gaudens, wrote to his Secretary of the Treasury, Leslie Mortier Shaw: "I think the state of our coinage is artistically of atrocious hideousness. Would it be possible, without asking permission of Congress, to employ a man like Saint-Gaudens to give us a coinage which would have some beauty?" Roosevelt had Mint Director George E. Roberts write to Saint-Gaudens, who replied, "I am extremely interested in the matter of the new designs of the coinage ... it will I assure you give me great pleasure to assist in the procuring of good work." Roosevelt caused the Mint to engage Saint-Gaudens to redesign some of the coins which could be changed without the need for Congressional approval—the cent and the four gold coins. (Note: Burdette 2006, pp. 41–42. The cent was designed, but its obverse was used for the eagle coin, which was produced alongside the double eagle. Burdette 2006, p. 209. The double eagle design was to be adapted for half eagle and quarter eagle, but the project was abandoned in 1908, it proving impossible to legibly place the required lettering on such small coins bearing the Saint-Gaudens design, especially with "In God We Trust" added. Burdette 2006, p. 322.) No U.S. coin had ever been designed by anyone other than a Mint employee.

In November 1905, Roosevelt wrote to Saint-Gaudens to enquire how the gold coinage was progressing. The President mentioned that he had been looking at gold coins of Ancient Greece, and that the most beautiful ones were in high relief. (Note: Higher relief than usual for coins. In sculpture, the term "high relief" is rather imprecise, but is typically used to describe reliefs where 50% or more of the notional volume of the subject projects from the background, something that almost never happens in coins. See "high relief" Merriam-Webster dictionary, and Avery, Charles, "Relief sculpture", in Grove Art Online.) Roosevelt suggested that the new designs could be in high relief, with a high rim to protect them. Saint-Gaudens replied agreeing with Roosevelt, and proposing a design for the double eagle

some kind of a (possibly winged) figure of Liberty, striding forward as if on a mountaintop, holding aloft on one arm a shield bearing the stars and stripes with the word Liberty marked across the field; in the other hand perhaps a flaming torch, the drapery [of Liberty's dress] would be flowing in the breeze. My idea is to make it a living thing, and typical of progress.

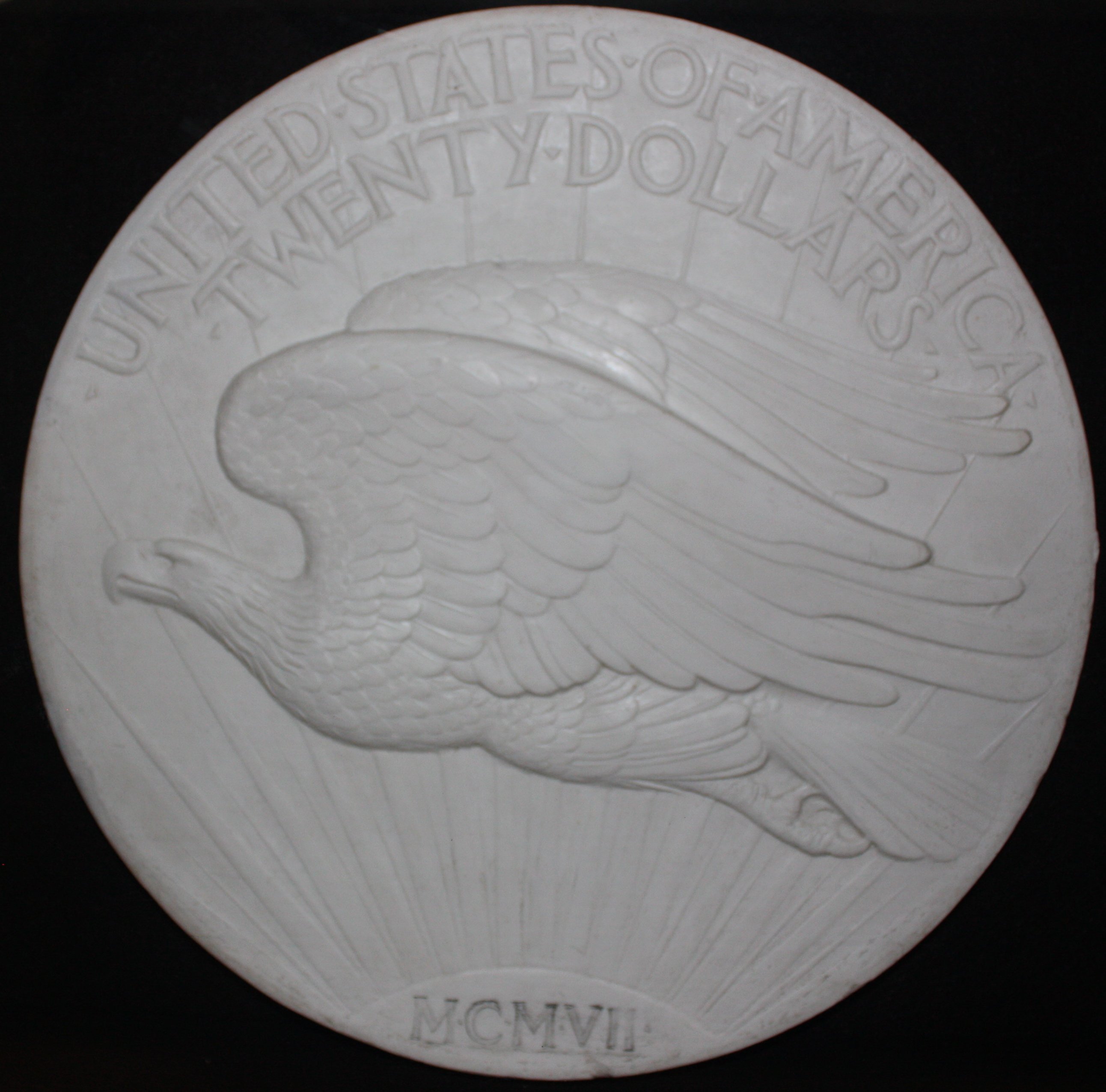
Early model for the reverse of the double eagle, displaying the date in Roman numerals

On January 2, 1906, Saint-Gaudens wrote to Shaw, enquiring whether a high relief was practical on coins struck at the Mint. Shaw did not immediately reply, but instead met with Roosevelt, who wrote that there was no objection to have the coins, many of which would be stored in bank vaults and not circulated, "as artistic as the Greeks could desire". Roosevelt secured Shaw's support for the redesign, although as the President wrote to Saint-Gaudens, "of course he thinks I am a crack-brained lunatic on the subject". Shaw wrote to the sculptor on January 13, reproducing a copy of a letter from Roberts which warned, "the judgement of the authority of all countries is that modern coins must be of low relief", but as the President disagreed with Roberts's view, Saint-Gaudens could go ahead with a high-relief design. Numismatic historian Roger W. Burdette commented, "This is also one of those times when the compelling egos of artist and President might have paid greater attention to director Roberts' comments. By continuing with the design in a relief that was not coinable, Saint-Gaudens lost his best chance to explore the limits of artistry on circulation coinage."

Saint-Gaudens wrote to Roosevelt later in January, "Whatever I produce cannot be worse than the inanities now displayed on our coins." However, Saint-Gaudens foresaw resistance from Barber, who "has been in that institution since the foundation of the government, and will be found standing in its ruins". In May 1906, the sculptor wrote to Roosevelt that he had sent an assistant to Washington to obtain the technical details of the redesign, but "if you succeed in getting the best of the polite Mr. Barber or the others in charge, you will have done a greater work than putting through the Panama Canal. Nevertheless, I will stick at it, even unto death."

In May 1906, Saint-Gaudens wrote to Secretary Shaw, asking if there was any objection to having the date in Roman numerals. Shaw replied, "While we are making coins for the people of the United States, I think we should confine ourselves to the English language. I have reminded our architects that I will dismiss the first one who puts a V on a public building where a U is intended." However, Roosevelt overruled Shaw, and the sculptor proceeded with the use of Roman numerals.

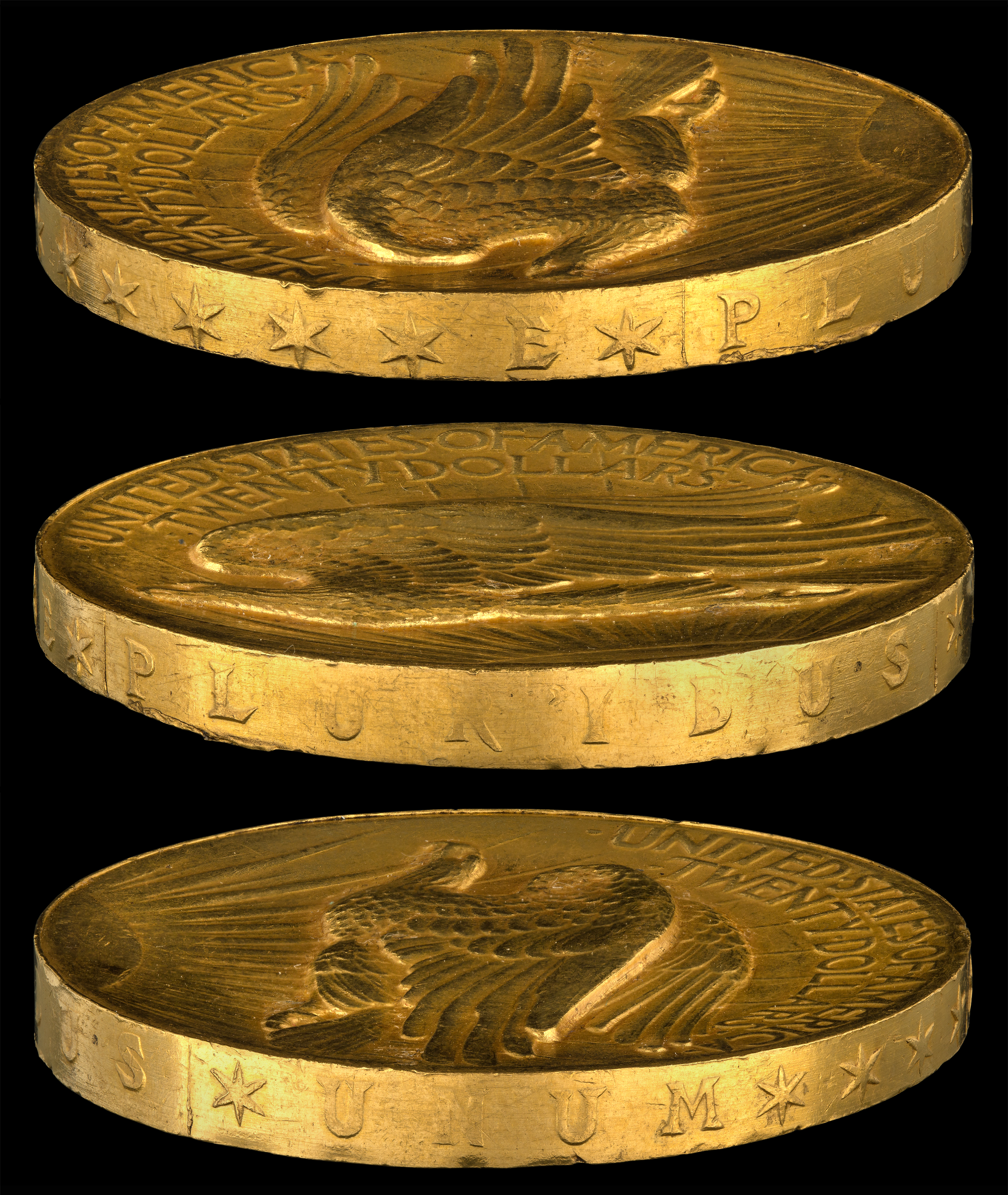
Side of the 1907 "high relief" double eagle showing edge lettering and surface detail

Saint-Gaudens had intended a flying eagle design for the cent, but developed it for the twenty-dollar piece after learning that by law, an eagle was not to appear on the cent. Saint-Gaudens's health worsened through 1906, as the cancer which would kill him forced him to have his assistant, Henry Hering, deal with many of the details of the work. Saint-Gaudens had the models for the coins made in Paris, rather than at the Mint, in order to bypass any obstruction by the Mint. It was not until December 1906 that Roosevelt was finally given coin-sized models of Saint-Gaudens's work by Hering, and Roosevelt wrote to the ailing sculptor, "I have instructed the Director of the Mint that these dies are to be reproduced just as quickly as possible and just as they are. It is simply splendid. I suppose I shall be impeached for it by Congress, but I shall regard that as a very cheap payment!"

The obverse of Saint-Gaudens's final design shows a female figure of Liberty, who also represents victory. Saint-Gaudens based his design on the female figure he had designed in creating New York City's monument to General William Tecumseh Sherman, but the sculptor's ultimate inspiration was the Nike of Samothrace. The figure for the Sherman monument was modeled by Hettie Anderson, one of the artist's favorite subjects. An alternative theory states that Saint-Gaudens modelled Liberty on a woman named Mary Cunningham (born c.1880 in Carrick, County Donegal, Ireland), whom he met at an inn near his studio in Cornish, New Hampshire. On the coin, Liberty holds a torch in one hand, representing enlightenment; an olive branch in the other, a symbol of peace. She strides across a rocky outcrop; behind her are the United States Capitol and the rays of the Sun. The figure is surrounded by 46 stars, one for each of the states in 1907. The reverse is a side view of a flying eagle, seen slightly from below, with a rising Sun and its rays behind it, complementing the obverse design. The edge bears the lettering "E Pluribus Unum". (Note: Yeoman 2013, p. 278. Oklahoma was admitted into the Union in late 1907, but the authorizing legislation had been passed in 1906. Burdette 2006, p. 120.) Saint-Gaudens felt he could not place a third line of text on the reverse without unbalancing the composition, and the obverse lacked room for the motto, so it was placed on the edge.

== From design to coin ==
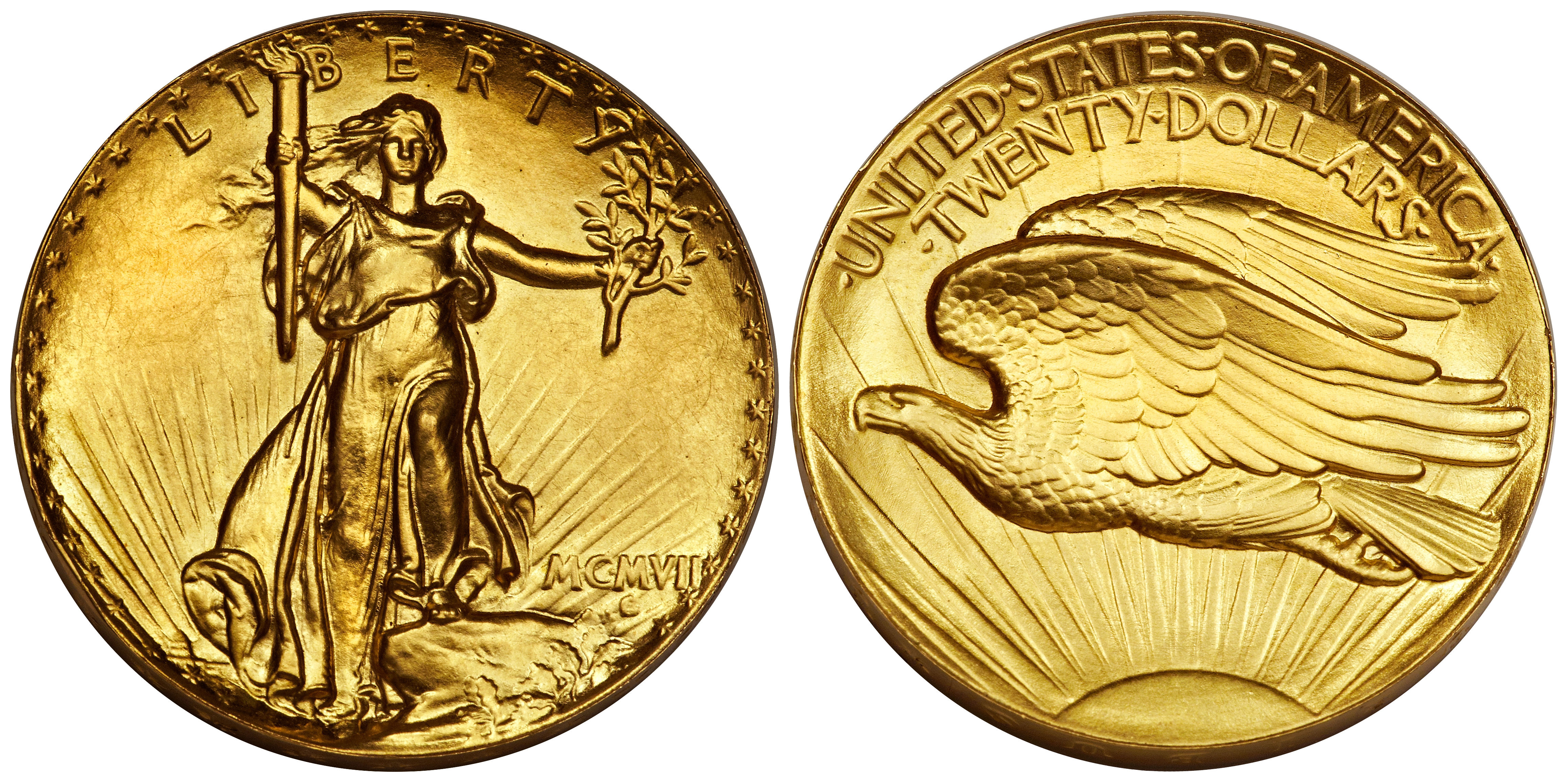
About two dozen of the ultra high relief 1907 double eagles were struck. This specimen sold for just over £2.1 million in 2015.

Mint Engraver Barber had closely followed the progress of the proposed recoinage, and wrote to Acting Mint Director Robert Preston on November 26, 1906:

[Saint-Gaudens] talks so much about experiments, it may be to him, but to us it is no experiment, as we are just as certain that the relief of his eagle will never coin, as we are certain that the Sun will rise each morning, and the only object in all this trouble and waste of money is to convince those who will be convinced in no other way ... I think our friend [Saint-Gaudens] is playing a game ... but our willingness, nay more, our desire to let the work tell its own story has rather called his hand, and he is not prepared to show it, and therefore is sparing for wind, or time. (Note: Burdette 2006, p. 69. At the time, Saint-Gaudens was still contemplating identical designs for the eagle and double eagle.)

In response to Barber's letter, Preston wrote to Saint-Gaudens, "there are no presses anywhere, in mints or in use among silversmiths, which can bring up your proposed relief at a single stroke." When the models were brought to the Mint, Barber examined and rejected them. It was only after considerable discussion that he agreed to experiment. At that time, the Mint was intensely busy generating designs for new coinage for Cuba and the Philippines, and Barber was reluctant to waste time on what he considered an experimental piece which would never be coined for circulation. Experimental dies were made from the plaster model. Approximately 24 pieces were struck as patterns; even though the Mint used a medal press, set for maximum pressure, it still took up to nine strokes of the press to fully bring out the design. These patterns are today known as the "Ultra High Relief" or "Extra High Relief" pieces, and only about 20 are known—one sold in a 2005 auction for $2,990,000. On May 8, 1907, the President wrote Saint-Gaudens, "It has proved hitherto impossible to strike them by one blow, which is necessary under the conditions of making coins of the present day." On May 11, 1907, Saint-Gaudens replied, "I am grieved that the striking of the die did not bring better results. Evidently it is no trifling matter to make Greek art conform with modern numismatics."

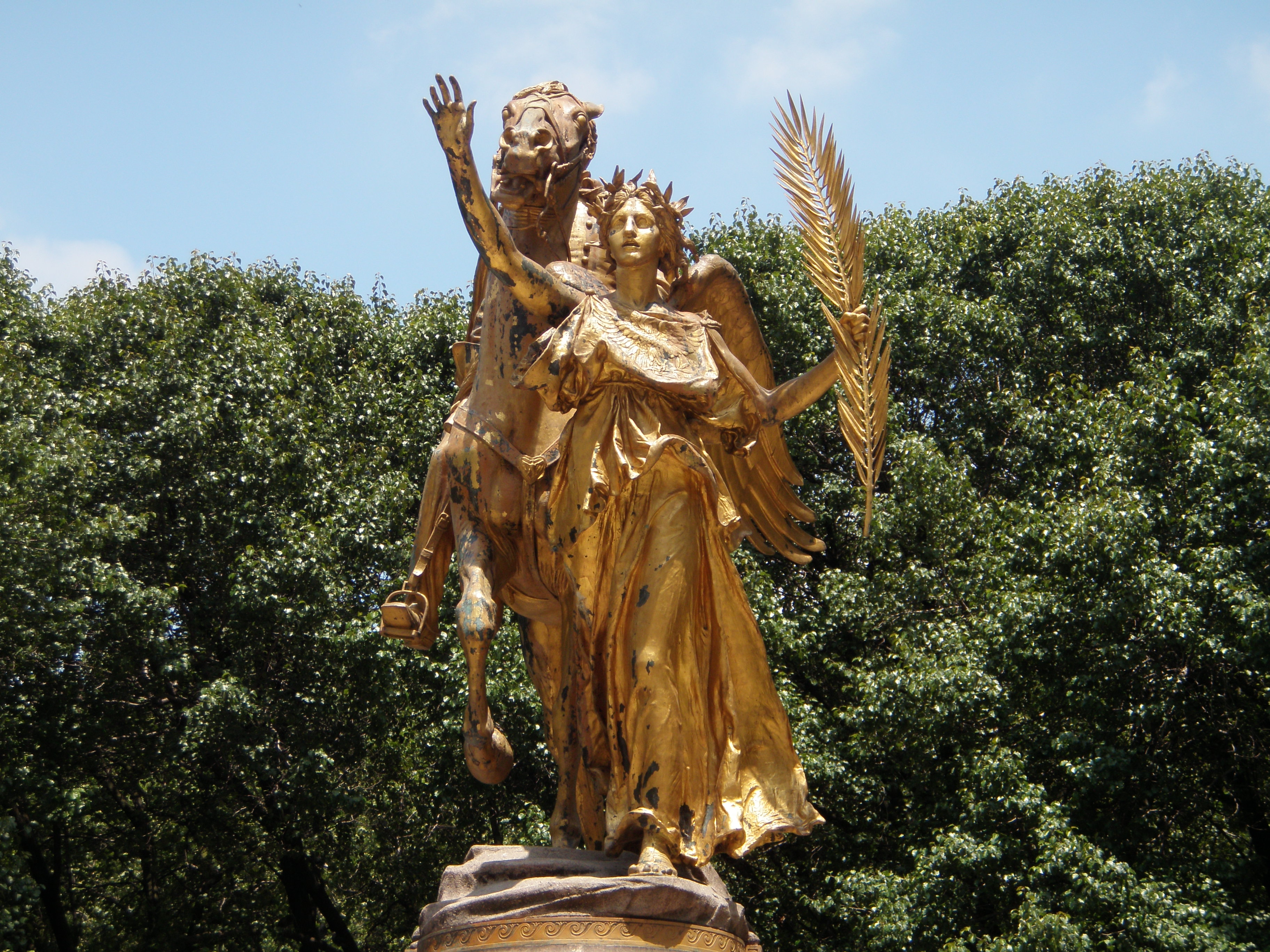
Saint-Gaudens's 1902 statue of Victory, part of the Sherman monument in New York City, was used for the design of Liberty on the obverse of the double eagle.

A second set of dies was produced with the relief reduced somewhat, but still proved too high relief for practical coining, requiring three strokes of the press to fully bring out the design. Saint-Gaudens had produced the models for these dies under the misapprehension that the first pieces had been struck on a production press, rather than on the Mint's only medal press, and therefore only slight adjustment need be made. When Saint-Gaudens died on August 3, 1907, Hering was working on a third model. Uncertain where to find Hering, Roosevelt ordered the new Secretary of the Treasury, George Cortelyou, to have the Mint finalize the design and put the coin in circulation by September 1. Barber was recalled from his vacation in Ocean Grove, New Jersey, to comply with the President's order. Barber wrote Philadelphia Mint Superintendent John Landis on August 14 that what Roosevelt wanted was impossible; he had no dies nor any clear idea of how Saint-Gaudens had planned to reduce the relief. The Mint chief engraver alleged that he could take no action with respect to the double eagle. On September 28, Hering finally appeared at the Mint with a new set of models, which Barber again quickly rejected. Barber wrote to Preston, "Upon examination it was found that the relief of the models was so great that it would be a waste of time to make reductions for coinage, as it would be quite impossible to coin when the dies are made." Instead, Barber began work on his own low relief version of Saint-Gaudens's design.

In August 1907, Roosevelt nominated San Francisco Mint Superintendent Frank Leach as Director of the Mint; he took office on November 1, 1907. In his memoirs, Leach recalled his initial interview with Roosevelt on the question of the double eagles:

Before I had become familiar with my surroundings the President sent for me. In the interview that followed he told me what he wanted, and what the failures and his disappointments had been, and proceeded to advise me as to what I should do to accomplish the purpose determined upon in the way of the new coinage. In this talk he suggested some details of action of a drastic character for my guidance, which he was positive were necessary to be adopted before success could be had. All this was delivered in his usual vigorous way, emphasizing many points by hammering on the desk with his fist.

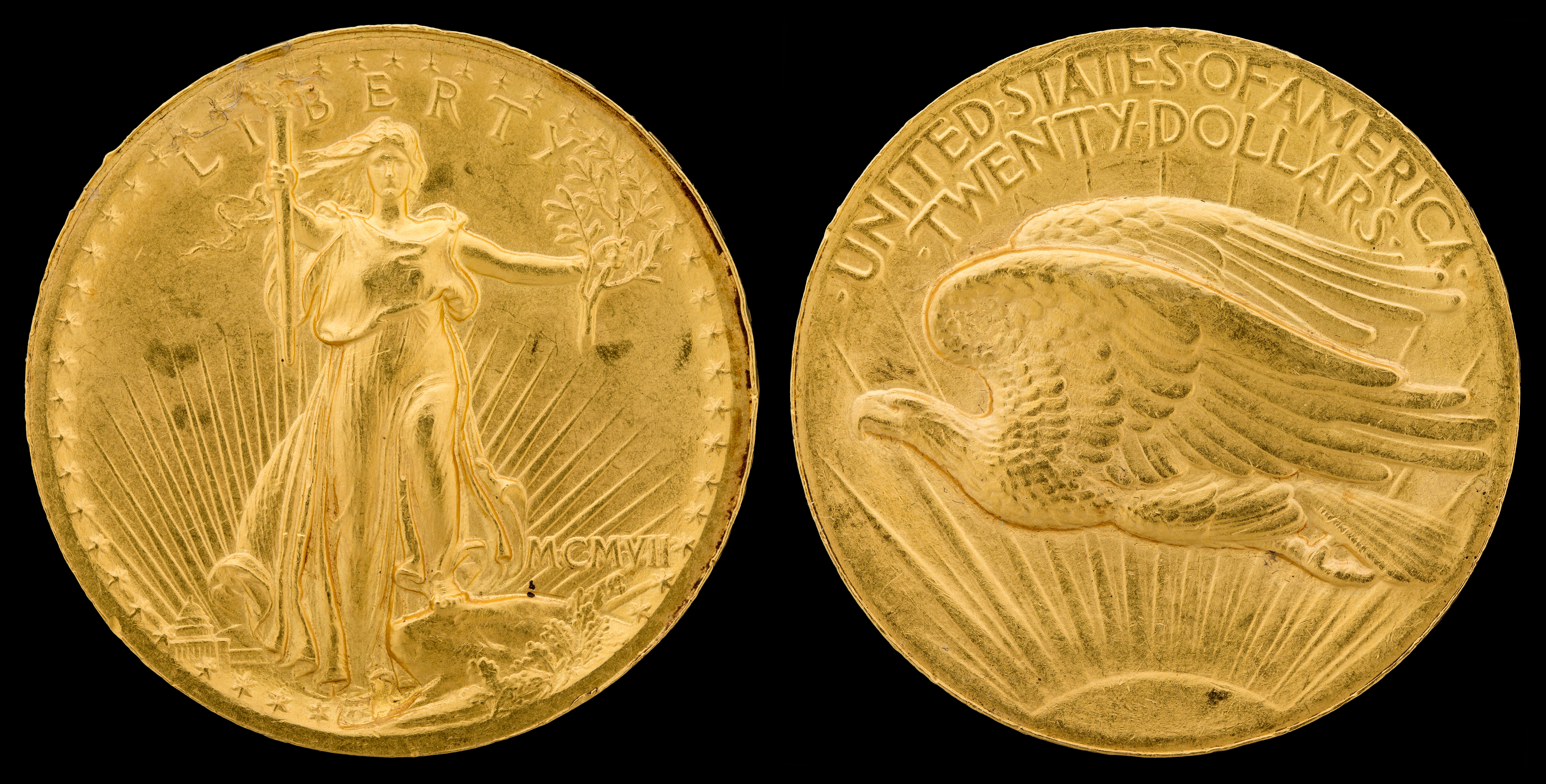
The "high relief" version of the 1907 Saint-Gaudens double eagle

On November 18, the impatient Roosevelt directed that the second set of dies be used to strike coins, directly ordering the Mint to "begin the new issue, even if it takes you all day to strike one piece!" Over 12,000 of these "High Relief" pieces were struck and were released into circulation in 1907 and 1908. Barber wrote of the High Relief pieces to Landis, "Mr. Hart has put the mill into operation and I send you two pieces showing the result; these are not selected as all the coins now made are the same as these two, which gives me alarm as they are so well made that I fear the President may demand the continuance of this particular coin." Barber completed work on his version of the design, with a greatly lowered relief, and the new coin went into production on a large-scale basis. A total of 361,667 of the revised design were produced by the Mint in 1907; the "Low Relief" coins were released into circulation at the end of December 1907. Barber's modifications were denounced both by the sculptor's family and by Hering. Among other alterations, Barber changed the Roman numeral MCMVII for the date to the Arabic numeral "1907". In spite of the modifications, according to R.S. Yeoman in his A Guide Book of United States Coins, many consider the Saint-Gaudens double eagles the most beautiful of U.S. coins.

In his book discussing the redesigns of U.S. coins between 1905 and 1908, Burdette casts blame on all parties for the delays in the new coin:

Responsibility for most of the delays in producing the new coinage must fall on the Saint-Gaudens studio for failing to deliver models in a timely manner. The mint failed in its responsibility to clearly communicate to the President and artist its limitations and technical requirements for large-scale coinage. President Roosevelt, likewise, must bear responsibility for constantly confusing the project with conflicting or incomplete communication to the artist and Mint Bureau.

Despite the difficulties with the design, Roosevelt was very pleased with the new double eagle. Mint Director Leach recalled that when "I laid upon his desk a sample of beautifully executed double eagles of the Saint-Gaudens design, he was most enthusiastic in his expressions of pleasure and satisfaction. I certainly believed him when he declared he was 'delighted'. He warmly congratulated me on my success, and was most complimentary in his comments." In January 1908, the President wrote to his friend, William Sturgis Bigelow:

I am very much pleased that you like that coin. I shall have all kinds of trouble over it, but I do feel what you say is true: that is, that it is the best coin that has been struck for two thousand years, and that no matter what is its temporary fate, it will serve as a model for future coin makers, and that eventually the difficulties in connection with making such coins will be surmounted.

== Production ==
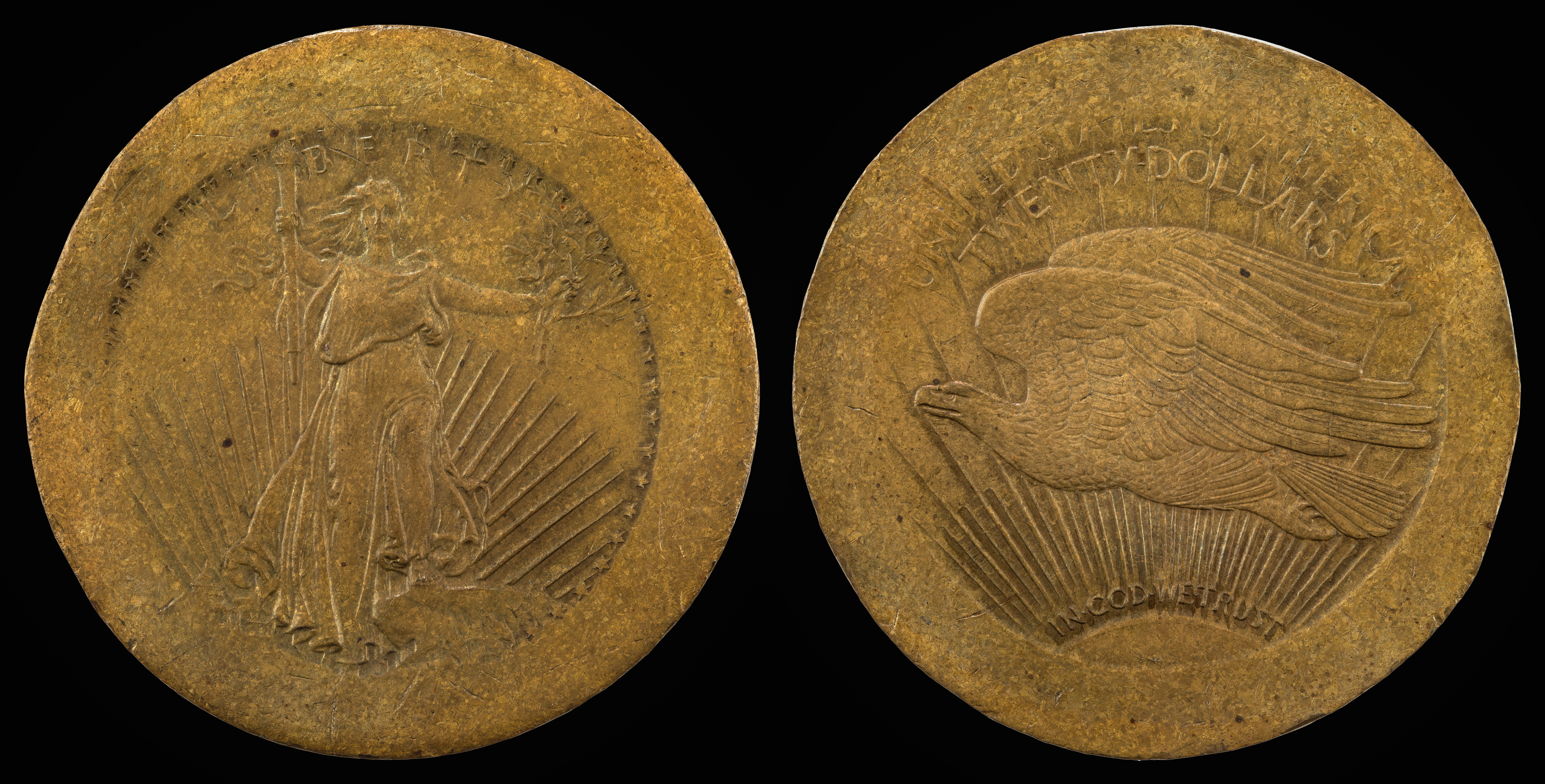
Die trial struck as the Mint prepared to place "In God We Trust" on the coins

Roosevelt had specifically requested Saint-Gaudens not to put "In God We Trust" on the new coin, feeling that the motto's presence on coins was a debasement of God's name, as the coins might be spent to further criminal activities. Saint-Gaudens was quite willing to omit the motto, as he felt the words detracted from the design elements. There was a public outcry about the omission of the motto, and what Breen describes as an "outraged and furious" Congress ordered the motto to appear. Barber duly modified the coin to include the motto, taking the opportunity to make several minor changes to the design, which, according to Breen, do not improve the coin. In 1912, two more stars were added to the obverse to reflect the admission of New Mexico and Arizona to the Union. The existing stars were not adjusted in position; the two new ones were placed on the outcropping at the lower right.

The only major variety of the series occurred in 1909, an overdate in which an 8 shows under the final nine in the date. This most likely happened when a 1908 die was struck by a 1909-dated hub, creating the overdate. Perhaps half of the 161,282 double eagles struck at Philadelphia that year display the overdate.

In 1916, minting of double eagles ceased, as bullion prices were rising because of World War I, which also caused an influx of American gold coins from Europe. Holders of gold coin, such as banks, refused to pay them out at par value, and they vanished from circulation. In the aftermath of the war, international demand for the coin was restored; many Europeans distrusted their local currencies and desired double eagles to hold. The coin was struck in large numbers once coinage was resumed in 1920, but it was now almost exclusively a coin of international trade, or was held by banks as backing for gold certificates. The coin itself rarely circulated in the United States. The onset of the Depression in 1929 did not halt the minting of double eagles, but the coins were for the most part held in Treasury vaults, and few were released. Many of the great rarities of the Saint-Gaudens series stem from its final years. Despite a mintage of almost 1.8 million pieces of the 1929 double eagle, it is estimated that fewer than 2,000 exist today, with all the rest melted by the government in the late 1930s.

== End of the series; the 1933 double eagle ==
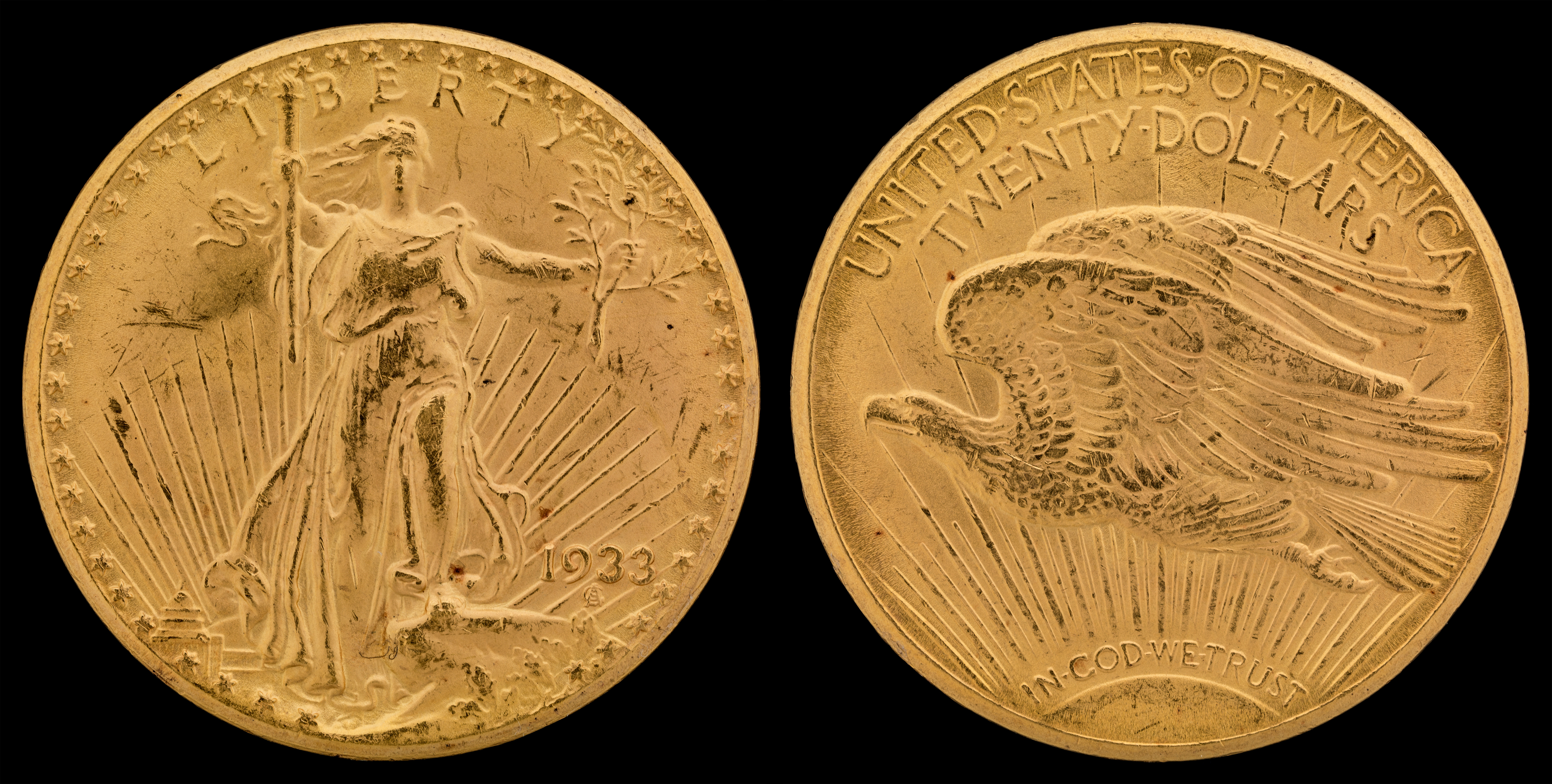
1933 Double eagle (Smithsonian specimen)

According to numismatic historian Roger Burdette, the first 1933 double eagles were struck on March 2, 1933. On March 15, 1933, 25,000 new double eagles were delivered to Mint Cashier Harry Powell, and by longstanding Mint custom, were available for paying out. On March 6, however, the newly inaugurated president, Franklin Roosevelt, had ordered the Treasury not to pay out any gold, and ordered that banks holding gold transmit it to their Federal Reserve bank. Numismatists and coin dealers were still allowed to possess and deal in gold coins; all others required a special license. The double eagle continued to be struck until May. On December 28, 1933, Acting Secretary of the Treasury Henry Morgenthau ordered Americans to turn in all gold coins and gold certificates, with limited exceptions, receiving paper money in payment. Millions of gold coins were melted down by the Treasury in the following years. Two 1933 double eagles were sent by the Mint to the Smithsonian Institution for the National Coin Collection, where they remain today.

Prominent coin dealer and numismatic writer Q. David Bowers suggests that despite the ban on paying out gold, examples of the 1933 double eagle could have been obtained legally from Mint Cashier Powell in an exchange for earlier double eagles. Bowers also notes that Secretary of the Treasury William Woodin was a numismatist who in addition to collecting coins, had written books on the subject. Dealer William Nagy later recalled visiting Secretary Woodin and being shown five 1933 double eagles, with the secretary stating that he had several more.

By the early 1940s, between eight and ten specimens were known; two of them were sold by Texas dealer B. Max Mehl. In 1944, a journalist enquired of the Mint regarding the 1933 double eagles. Mint officials could find no record of any issuance of the coins, and decided those in private hands must have been obtained illegally. Over the next few years, the Secret Service seized a number of specimens, which were subsequently melted. One piece, however, wound up in the hands of King Farouk of Egypt, who even obtained a U.S. export license for the coin. What became of the Farouk specimen after his death is unclear, but what is considered by historians to be his coin resurfaced in the late 1990s. When brought to New York for sale to a prospective buyer, it was seized by U.S. authorities. After litigation, a compromise was reached to allow the coin to be auctioned, with the proceeds to be divided equally between the government and the private owners. In 2002 this coin sold at auction by Sotheby's for $7,590,020. The purchase price included $20 paid to the federal government to monetize a coin it contended had never been officially released. It sold again in 2021 for $18.9 million.

In 2004, 10 specimens of the 1933 double eagle were submitted to the Mint for authentication by the heirs of a Philadelphia jeweler who may have been involved in obtaining them from the Mint in 1933. The Mint authenticated them, and refused to give them back. The heirs brought suit against the government in 2006, and a federal judge ordered the government to file a forfeiture action regarding the coins. The government brought such a suit in 2009; it was tried in the United States District Court for the Eastern District of Pennsylvania beginning on July 7, 2011. On July 21, 2011, a jury decided that the coins had been properly seized by the Federal government. Judge Legrome D. Davis confirmed that jury verdict on August 29, 2012. On April 17, 2015, a panel of the United States Court of Appeals for the Third Circuit ruled that the government had failed to file its forfeiture action in a timely manner, and that the heirs were entitled to the coins. That ruling was vacated by the full court on July 28, 2015, and the case set for further argument. On August 1, 2016, the full Third Circuit ruled in favor of the government, upholding the jury verdict. The heirs, on November 4 of that year, asked the Supreme Court to review the case, which refused to hear it on April 21, 2017, ending the case.

== Reuse of the design ==
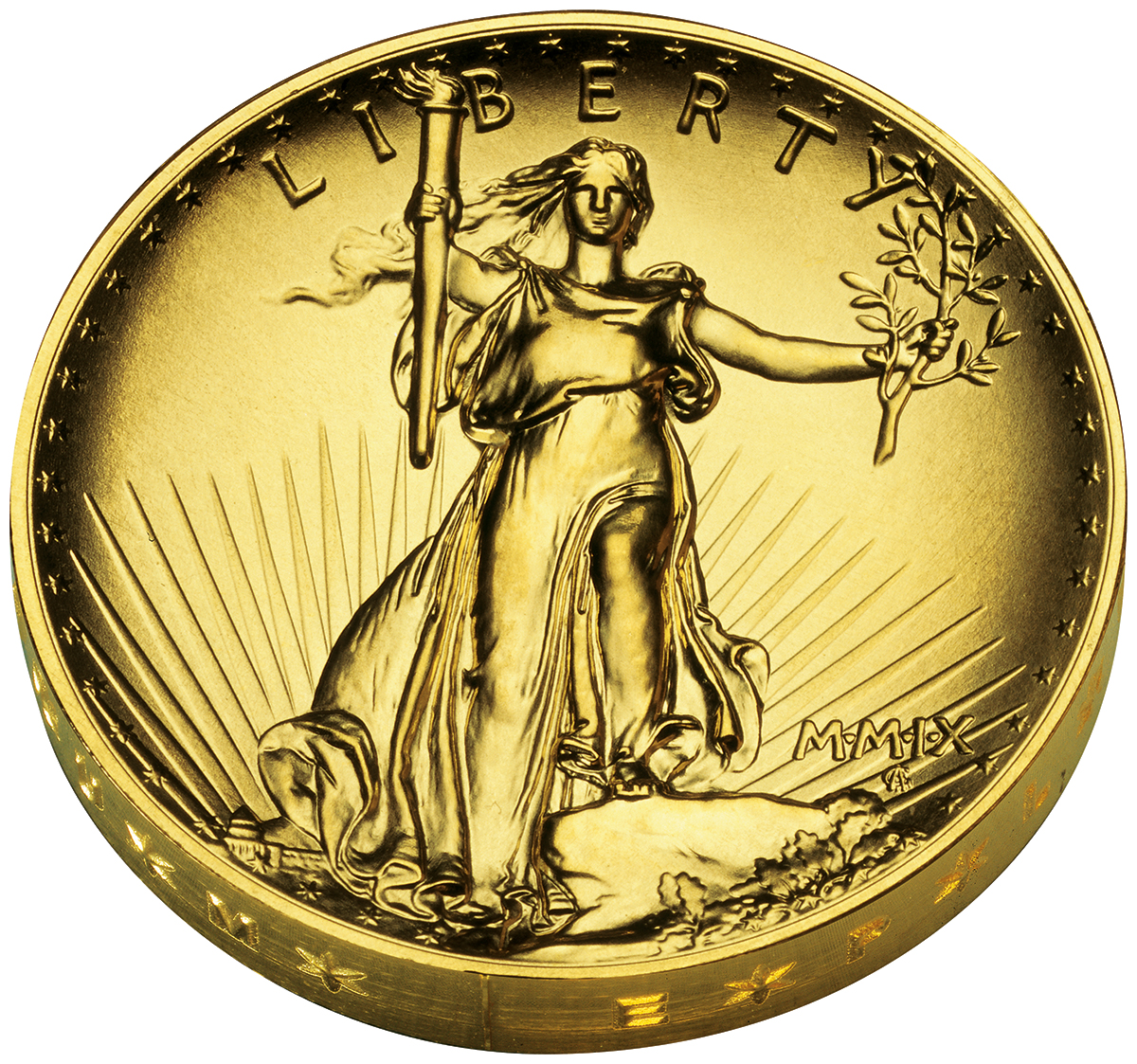
The 2009 reduced-diameter reissue of the Saint-Gaudens design

The obverse has appeared on American gold bullion coinage issued since 1986. Saint-Gaudens's original design was reused, with two stars added next to the two which Barber had added in 1912, recognizing the admission of Alaska and Hawaii to the Union. Saint-Gaudens's reverse was not used, yielding its place to sculptor Miley Busiek's depiction of a family of eagles.

In 1907, the Mint had experimented by striking about two dozen pieces of the same weight as the double eagle, bearing Saint-Gaudens's design, but which had a smaller, thicker planchet. These "checker" pieces were destroyed (except two placed in the Mint's coin collection) when it was discovered that the consent of Congress was needed to change the diameter of any coin. In 2009, the Mint struck a similar piece in .999 gold, using Saint-Gaudens's original ultra high relief design for both sides of the coin, though modified to a 50-star obverse. These pieces contain one ounce of gold, slightly more than the original double eagle.

In November 2025, the Mint announced it would re-issue the gold version in 2026, with a 1907 date expressed in Roman numerals and a Liberty Bell privy mark. The gold coin will be accompanied by a silver medal as part of the 2026 "Best of the Mint" commemoration, part of the observance of the 250th anniversary of American independence.

== Mintages and rarity ==
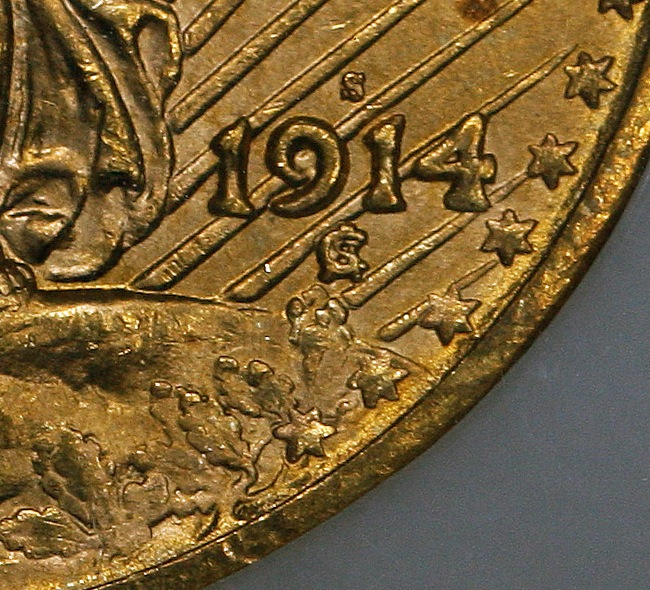
Detail from 1914-S double eagle showing the mintmark above the date, Saint-Gaudens's monogram below it, and the two stars added to the design in 1912

The mintmark appears above the date between the second and third numbers.

- Blank (Philadelphia Mint in Philadelphia, Pennsylvania)
- D (Denver Mint in Denver, Colorado)
- S (San Francisco Mint in San Francisco, California)

| Year | Mint mark | Proofs | Circulation strikes |
|---|---|---|---|
| 1907 Ultra High Relief | | est. 22—24 | |
| 1907 High Relief | | | 12,367 |
| 1907 Low Relief | | | 361,667 |
| 1908 No Motto | | | 4,271,551 |
| 1908 No Motto | D | | 663,750 |
| 1908 With Motto | | 101 | 156,258 |
| 1908 With Motto | D | | 349,500 |
| 1908 With Motto | S | | 22,000 |
| 1909 (includes 1909/8) | | 67 | 161,282 |
| 1909 | D | | 52,500 |
| 1909 | S | | 2,774,925 |
| 1910 | | 167 | 482,000 |
| 1910 | D | | 429,000 |
| 1910 | S | | 2,128,150 |
| 1911 | | 100 | 197,250 |
| 1911 | D | | 846,500 |
| 1911 | S | | 775,750 |
| 1912 | | 74 | 149,750 |
| 1913 | | 58 | 168,780 |
| 1913 | D | | 393,500 |
| 1913 | S | | 34,000 |
| 1914 | | 70 | 95,250 |
| 1914 | D | | 453,000 |
| 1914 | S | | 1,498,000 |
| 1915 | | 50 | 152,000 |
| 1915 | S | | 567,500 |
| 1916 | S | | 796,000 |
| 1920 | | | 228,250 |
| 1920 | S | | 558,000 |
| 1921 | | | 528,500 |
| 1922 | | | 1,375,500 |
| 1922 | S | | 2,658,000 |
| 1923 | | | 566,000 |
| 1923 | D | | 1,702,250 |
| 1924 | | | 4,323,500 |
| 1924 | D | | 3,049,500 |
| 1924 | S | | 2,927,500 |
| 1925 | | | 2,831,750 |
| 1925 | D | | 2,938,500 |
| 1925 | S | | 3,776,500 |
| 1926 | | | 816,750 |
| 1926 | D | | 481,000 |
| 1926 | S | | 2,041,500 |
| 1927 | | | 2,946,750 |
| 1927 | D | | 180,000 |
| 1927 | S | | 3,107,000 |
| 1928 | | | 8,816,000 |
| 1929 | | | 1,779,750 |
| 1930 | S | | 74,000 |
| 1931 | | | 2,938,250 |
| 1931 | D | | 106,500 |
| 1932 | | | 1,101,750 |
| 1933 | | | 445,500 |
| 2009 Ultra High Relief | see Note | | 115,178 |

Note: The 2009 Ultra High Relief was minted in the West Point Mint, but has no mint mark.

The mintages are in many cases not a true indication of relative rarity. Coins remaining in bank vaults in the United States were melted after 1933; coins in bank vaults overseas were not. Millions of double eagles, of both the Liberty Head and Saint-Gaudens designs, were repatriated for numismatic and investment purposes once it was legal to do so. By way of example, the 1924 Saint-Gaudens double eagle was once thought to be rare although 4,323,500 were struck; when the Mint offered a list of coins available at face value plus postage in 1932, the 1924 was not on that list. Large quantities of 1924 double eagles were found in European bank vaults, and today the 1924 is one of the most common of the series. On the other hand, the 1925-S had 3,776,500 struck, but few were released or exported, remaining in Treasury and bank vaults—but available from the Treasury at face value in 1932. Fewer than a thousand are known to have survived; one, in almost-perfect condition (graded MS-67) sold in 2005 for $287,500.

== Bibliography ==
- Bowers, Q. David (2004). A Guide Book of Double Eagle Gold Coins. Atlanta, Ga.: Whitman Publishing. ISBN 978-0-7948-1784-8.
- Breen, Walter (1988). Walter Breen's Complete Encyclopedia of U.S. and Colonial Coins. New York, N.Y.: Doubleday. ISBN 978-0-385-14207-6. OL 4404444M.
- Burdette, Roger W. (2006). Renaissance of American Coinage, 1905–1908. Great Falls, Va.: Seneca Mill Press. ISBN 978-0-9768986-1-0.
- Garrett, Jeff; Guth, Ron (2008). Encyclopedia of U.S. Gold Coins, 1795–1933 (second ed.). Atlanta, Ga.: Whitman Publishing. ISBN 978-0-7948-2254-5.
- Halperin, James L; Van Winkle, Mark; Amato, Jon; Rohan, Gregory J. (2006). The Coinage of Augustus Saint-Gaudens. Dallas, Tex.: Ivy Press. ISBN 978-1-59967-058-4.
- Lange, David W. (2006). History of the United States Mint and its Coinage. Atlanta, Ga.: Whitman Publishing. ISBN 978-0-7948-1972-9.
- Leach, Frank (1917). Recollections of a Newspaperman. San Francisco, CA: S. Levinson.
- Roach, Steve (April 4, 2011). "Parties lay out strategy in 1933 $20 case". Coin World. Amos Press.
- Taxay, Don (1983). The U.S. Mint and Coinage (reprint of 1966 ed.). New York, N.Y.: Sanford J. Durst Numismatic Publications. ISBN 978-0-915262-68-7.
- Yeoman, R.S. (2013). A Guide Book of United States Coins (The Official Red Book) (67th ed.). Atlanta, Ga.: Whitman Publishing. ISBN 978-0-7948-4180-5.

Other sources

- Dale, Maryclaire (July 21, 2011). "Jury: US gov't rightfully seized 1933 gold coins". Yahoo! News. AP. Archived from the original on December 13, 2011.
- Gilkes, Paul (February 27, 2012). "Smithsonian 1933 $20 goes on European tour". Coin World. Archived from the original on November 25, 2012.
- Roach, Steve (September 24, 2012). "Judge confirms jury decision on 1933 case". Coin World. p. 1.
- Roach, Steve (April 17, 2015). "Court rules in favor of Langbord family in 1933 double eagle case". Coin World. Archived from the original on June 15, 2015.
- Roach, Steve (July 31, 2015). "1933 gold double eagle case continues as court vacates earlier ruling". Coin World. Archived from the original on August 4, 2015.
- Roach, Steve (August 2, 2015). "Langbord family loses appeal to regain ownership of 1933 double eagles". Coin World.
- Roach, Steve (November 11, 2016). "Langbord family petitions U.S. Supreme Court for return of 1933 double eagles". Coin World. p. 1.
- Gibbs, William T. (April 21, 2017). "Supreme Court declines to hear the case involving 10 1933 double eagles". Coin World.
