= Louis E. Eliasberg =

American numismatist (1896–1976)

- Born: February 12, 1896; Selma, Alabama, U.S.
- Died: February 20, 1976 (aged 80); Baltimore, Maryland, U.S.
- Education: Baltimore City College
- Occupations: Financier, numismatist
- Employer(s): Finance Company of America; Citizens National Bank

Louis Edward Eliasberg Sr. (February 12, 1896 – February 20, 1976) was an American financier and numismatist. He is best known as the "king of coins" in the numismatic community for putting together the only complete collection of United States coins ever assembled, consisting of regular issue coins of every date, metal, denomination, and mint mark known to collectors at the time, with attention to coins in the best possible condition. He began the collection during the 1920s and finished the set by purchasing the last gold coin he needed (1841 $2 1/2) in 1949 and the last silver coin he needed (1873-CC no arrows dime) in 1950.

== Collection ==
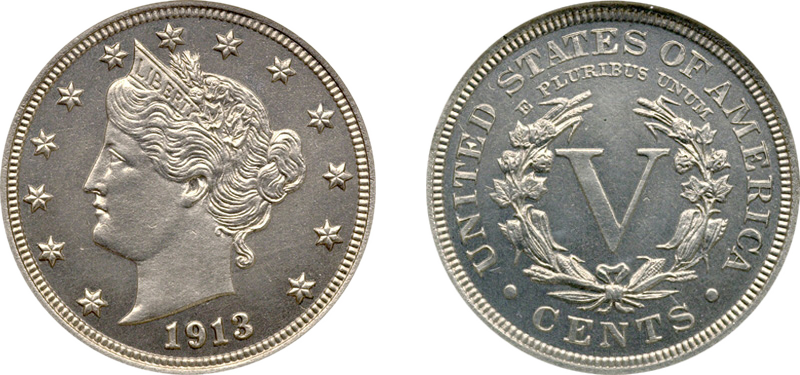
The Eliasberg Specimen 1913 Liberty Head nickel

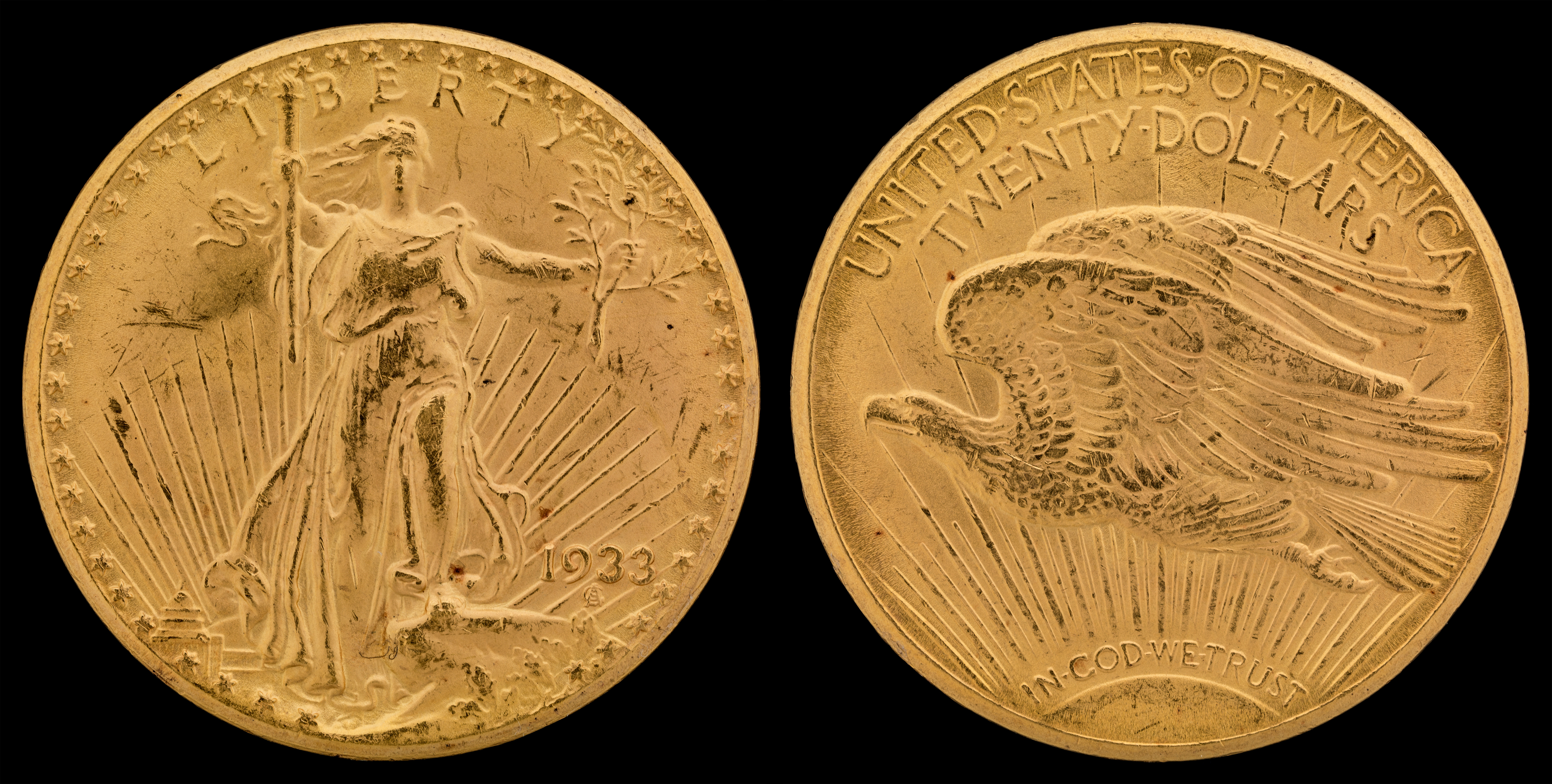
1933 Double Eagle

Eliasberg's United States collection might not be considered truly "complete" by modern standards; for instance, he did not differentiate between proofs and circulation strikes, as most contemporary collectors and set registries now do, and die variations were not emphasized, but it is still the most comprehensive U.S. numismatic collection to date. There were one or two coins unknown at the time of the completion of his collection that were later discovered, but there were no coins missing from the set unless one considers the 1849 Double Eagle to be a coin. (It is generally categorized as a pattern coin and only two were made: one is on display at the Smithsonian Institution and the other was given to then-Treasury Secretary William M. Meredith but its subsequent whereabouts are unknown.)

One of the highlights of the Eliasberg collection is a 1913 Liberty Head nickel known as the "Eliasberg Specimen." After Eliasberg's death, this coin was bought by an unnamed California collector for US$ 5 million on April 25, 2007. Another is the 1873-CC no-arrows Liberty Seated dime. This coin is also notable for being the last coin needed to complete the Eliasberg collection.

At one time, Eliasberg possessed a 1933 $20 gold coin, one of three then known to be owned by private collectors, including King Farouk of Egypt. In 1952, upon learning that the government believed the coins had not been legally issued by the mint and was recalling them, Eliasberg voluntarily returned his coin to the government without compensation. In July 2011, long after Eliasberg's death, a trial jury in U.S. District Court determined that ten other 1933 double eagles claimed as property by Mrs. Joan Langbord had been obtained illegally by Israel Switt and were property of the United States government; this decision was subsequently upheld the following August.

Although Eliasberg's American collection has generally received the most attention, his collection of world coins was also of great numismatic importance. In particular, his Latin American gold coin collection was known for its completeness and quality, and for the rarity of many of the examples. He also collected proof coins and presentation sets from European nations, and gold type coins from all around the world.

Eliasberg was presented with a special trophy by Numismatic Gallery Magazine in 1951, in recognition of his unique achievement in collecting the coins of the U.S.A. He was a generous and knowledgeable correspondent with other numismatists, and also with the coin-collecting public, which became aware of him after LIFE magazine published a feature story about his collection in the April 27, 1953, issue. This color-illustrated article contained images of 61 American coins and 23 world coins. As a result, Eliasberg received more than 7,000 queries and pieces of fan-mail, and he personally responded to each one.

It has been reliably estimated by other coin collectors of his era that Eliasberg spent around $400,000.00 to assemble the United States set. He later divided his collection between his two children, who separately sold the coins for many millions of dollars in four landmark auctions, as follows: 1) Bowers & Ruddy as "The United States Gold Coin Collection" in October 1982; 2) Bowers & Merena as "American Copper, Nickel, and Silver Coins I" in May 1996; 3) Bowers & Merena as "American Copper, Nickel, and Silver Coins II" in April 1997; 4) Stack's Bowers Galleries as "Gems and Treasures from the World Coin Section of the Eliasberg Collection" in 2005.

== Personal life ==
Louis Eliasberg was born on February 12, 1896, in Selma, Alabama, and was of Jewish descent. His family relocated to Baltimore in 1907, when he was around 11 years old, and he lived there the rest of his life. He attended Baltimore City College for a year and then began his banking career as a runner for the Citizens National Bank. In 1917 he founded the Finance Company of America, and was its leader for more than 50 years, remaining on as Honorary Chairman after his official retirement. He also served on the boards of other large firms, including Maryland National Bank, Read's, Inc., and the Tom Moore Distillery. His first wife was Hortense Miller Kahn Eliasberg. They married in 1927 and had two children. In 1974, he married Regina Lucille Gettier Eliasberg.
