= 1913 Liberty Head nickel =

Rare United States coin

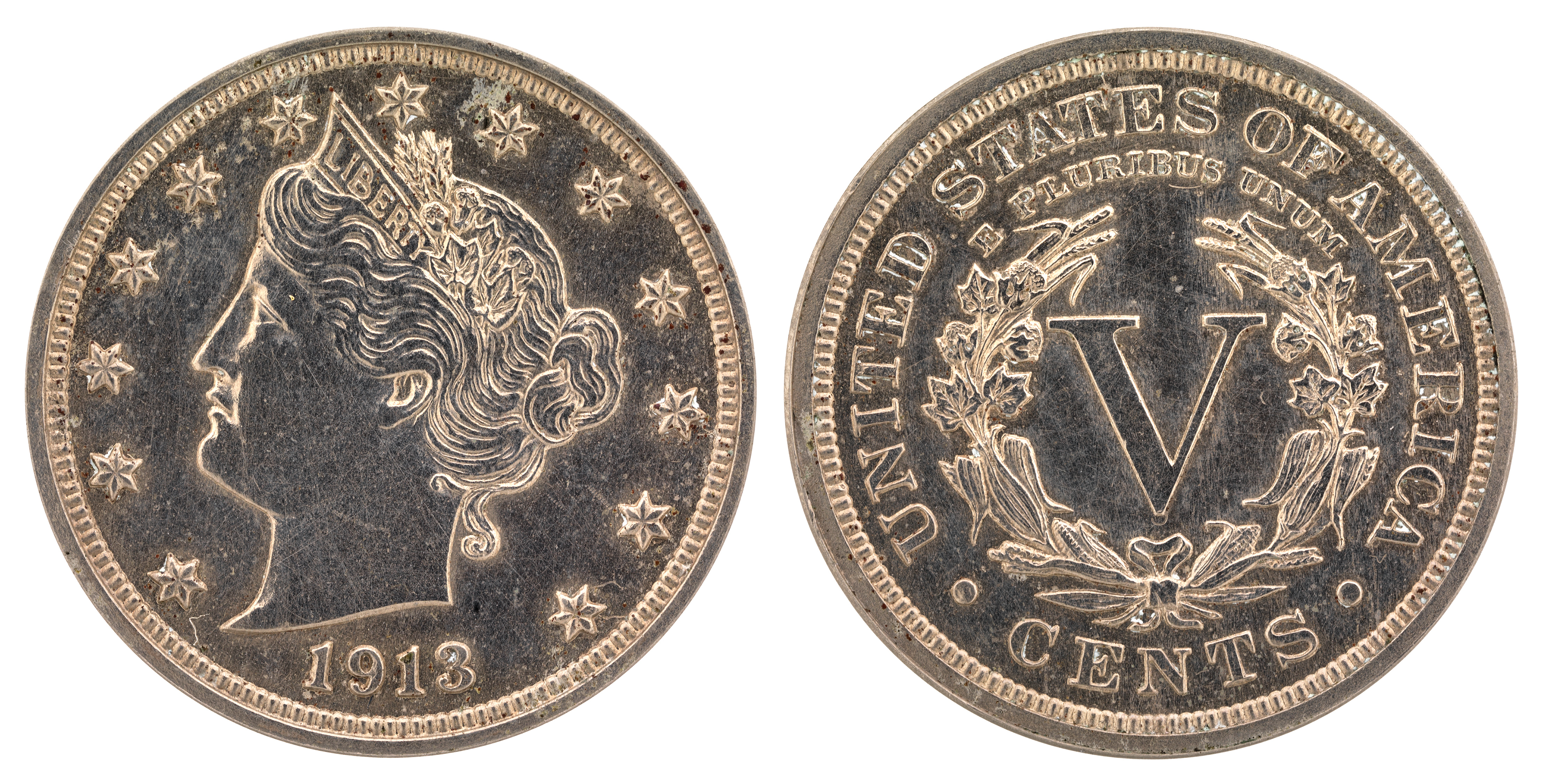
1913 Liberty Head Nickel (from the National Numismatic Collection).

The 1913 Liberty Head nickel is an American five-cent piece which was produced in extremely limited quantities unauthorized by the United States Mint, making it one of the best-known and most coveted rarities in American numismatics. In 1972, one specimen of the five cent coin became the first coin to sell for over US$100,000; in 1996, another specimen became the first to sell for over US$1 million. A specimen was sold for US$3 million in a 2004 private sale, then resold for US$3.7 million at a public auction in 2010.

Only five examples are known to exist: two in private collections and three in museums.

== Origin ==
The Indian Head (Buffalo) nickel was introduced in February 1913, replacing the Liberty Head design. These were the first official strikings of nickels in 1913, since the United States Mint's official records list no Liberty Head nickels produced in that year. However, in December, 1919, a previously unknown 1913 Liberty Head nickel was shown at a meeting of the Chicago Coin Club. Then in August 1920, the general numismatic community learned of five Liberty Head nickels dated 1913, all owned by Samuel Brown, a numismatist who attended the American Numismatic Association's annual convention and displayed the coins there. He had shown the nickel at the Chicago club meeting and had previously placed an advertisement in the December 1919 issue of The Numismatist soliciting information on these coins, offering to pay US $500 for each and ostensibly purchasing them as a result. However, Brown had been a Mint employee in 1913, and many numismatic historians have concluded that he may have struck them himself (or had them struck) and taken them from the Mint. If true, this was not a unique occurrence; such clandestine strikes were quite common in the 19th century, with the Class II and III 1804 silver dollars perhaps the best-known instance. Other numismatic authorities, such as Q. David Bowers, have questioned this scenario, and pointed out that there are several methods by which the coins could have been legitimately produced; e.g., they may have been lawfully issued by the Mint's Medal Department "for cabinet purposes", or could have been struck as trial pieces in late 1912 to test the following year's new coinage dies. Bowers, however, did not entirely discount the private minting theory.

== Pedigree ==
In January 1924, Samuel Brown sold all five 1913 Liberty Head nickels. The intact lot passed through the hands of several other coin dealers before finally being purchased by Colonel E. H. R. Green (son of the famous Gilded Age investor Hetty Green), who kept them in his collection until his death in 1936. His estate was then auctioned off, and the five 1913 Liberty Head nickels were purchased by two dealers, Eric P. Newman and B. G. Johnson, who broke up the set for the first time. Later rumors that there is a sixth specimen that was lost or is otherwise hidden appear to be unfounded.

== Eliasberg specimen ==
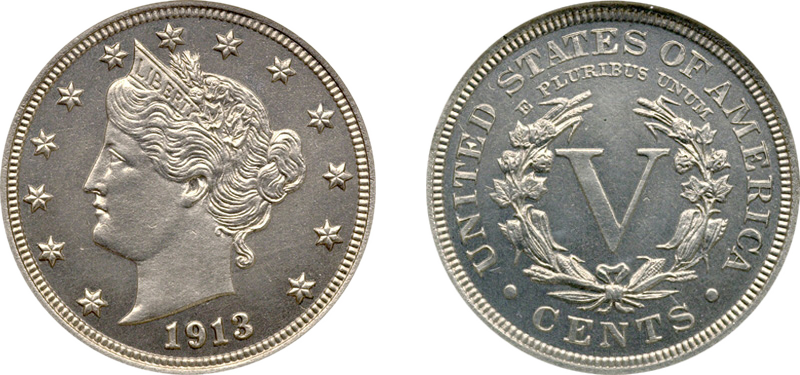
The Eliasberg specimen is the finest known 1913 Liberty Head nickel.

Of the five 1913 Liberty Head nickels, two have proof surfaces and the other three were produced with standard striking techniques. The Eliasberg specimen is the finest known 1913 Liberty Head nickel, with a grade of 66 from various professional grading services, including PCGS and NGC.

This coin was purchased from Newman and Johnson by the Numismatic Gallery, a coin dealership that then sold it to famed collector Louis Eliasberg. It remained in Eliasberg's comprehensive collection until after his death. In May 1996, it was sold at an auction conducted by Bowers and Merena to rarities dealer Jay Parrino for US$1,485,000: the highest price for a coin up until that point. When it was auctioned again in March 2001, the price climbed to US$1,840,000. In May 2005, Legend Numismatics purchased the Eliasberg specimen for US$4,150,000. In 2007, it was sold to an unnamed collector in California for US$5 million.

== Olsen specimen ==
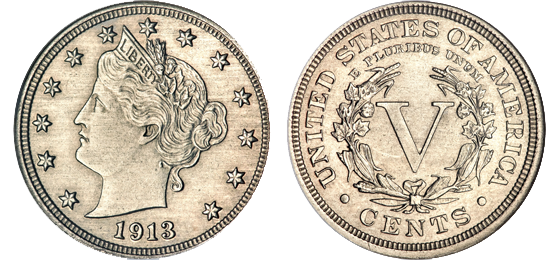
The Olsen specimen 1913 liberty nickel

While the Eliasberg specimen is the best preserved of the five coins, the Olsen specimen is almost certainly the most famous. It has been graded Proof-64 by both PCGS and NGC, and was featured on an episode of Hawaii Five-O ("The $100,000 Nickel", aired on December 11, 1973). It was also briefly owned by King Farouk of Egypt.

When Newman and Johnson broke up the set of five coins, the Olsen specimen was sold first to James Kelly and then to Fred Olsen. The latter sold the coin to Farouk, but his name has remained attached to it in numismatic circles ever since. In 1972, it was sold to World Wide Coin Investments for US$100,000 (equal to $769,690 today), thus inspiring its title appearance in Hawaii Five-O the following year. Its price doubled to US$200,000 when it was resold to Superior Galleries in 1978. It has been resold on several occasions since then, fetching US$3,000,000 in a private treaty sale from California collector Dwight Manley to Bruce Morelan and Legend Numismatics in June 2004. Legend sold the coin to Blanchard and Co. in 2005, who sold it to a private collector, and more recently for US$3,737,500 by Heritage Auctions in January 2010. The latest owner's name has not been disclosed.

== Norweb specimen ==
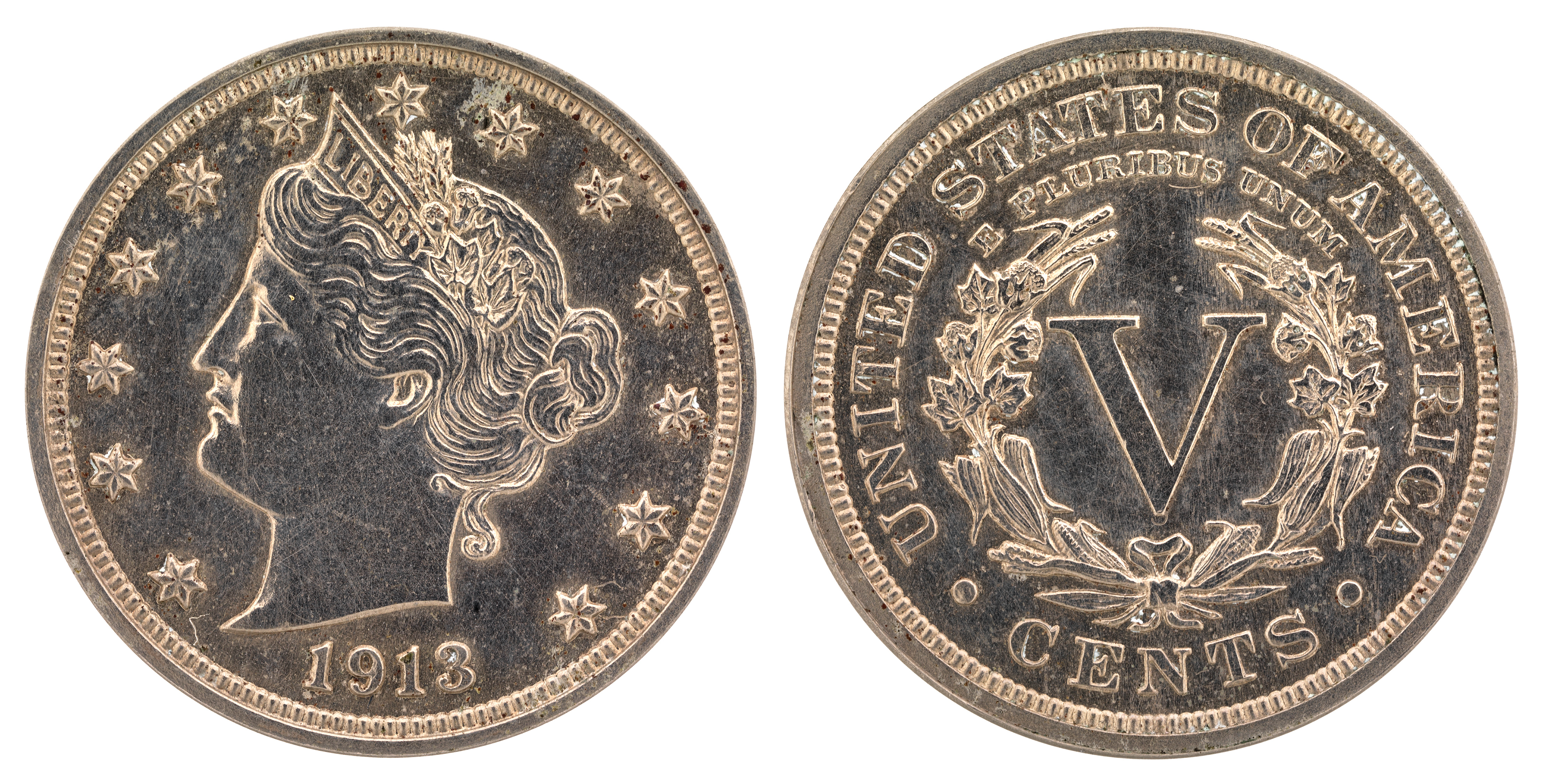
The Norweb specimen 1913 Liberty Head Nickel (from the National Numismatic Collection).

The Norweb specimen is one of two 1913 Liberty Head nickels that have ended up in museums. It is on exhibit at the Smithsonian Institution.

Newman and Johnson sold the Norweb specimen to F.C.C. Boyd, who then resold it to the Numismatic Gallery (which handled several of the coins over the years). In 1949, it was purchased by King Farouk to replace the Olsen specimen, which he had sold. It remained in Farouk's collection until he was deposed by Gamal Abdel Nasser in 1952. Two years after that, Farouk's possessions were all auctioned off by the new regime. The Numismatic Gallery regained possession of it, and sold it this time to Ambassador Henry Norweb and his wife. The Norwebs donated the specimen to the Smithsonian Institution’s National Numismatic Collection—where it remains—in 1978 to commemorate their sixtieth wedding anniversary.

== Walton specimen ==
The Walton specimen is the most elusive of the five 1913 Liberty Head nickels; for over 40 years, its whereabouts were unknown and it was believed to have been lost. George O. Walton, for whom the specimen is named, purchased it from Newman and Johnson in 1945 for approximately US$3,750, equal to $67,063 today. On March 9, 1962, Walton died in a car crash en route to a coin show. He had promised the show's promoters that he would exhibit the 1913 Liberty Head nickel there, so it was assumed to have been among the coins in his possession at the time of the fatal crash. US$250,000 worth of coins were recovered from the crash site, including the 1913 Liberty nickel, which was protected in a custom-made holder. When Walton's heirs put his coins up for public auction in 1963, the nickel was returned to them, because the auction house had mistakenly determined the coin to be not genuine. As a result, the coin remained in the family's possession, being stored in a strongbox on the floor of a closet in his sister's home, for over 40 years.

In July 2003, the American Numismatic Association arranged to display the four specimens whose whereabouts were known. As a publicity stunt, public relations consultant and former ANA governor Donn Pearlman launched a nationwide hunt for the missing fifth specimen. He arranged with Bowers and Merena auction house (at the time a division of Collectors Universe, Inc.) to offer a minimum US$1 million to purchase the coin, or as a guarantee for consigning it to one of their public auctions. In addition, a US$10,000 reward was offered simply for letting representatives of Bowers and Merena be the first to see the missing fifth specimen when found. After learning about the reward, the Walton heirs brought their coin to the ANA convention in Baltimore, where expert authenticators from Professional Coin Grading Service examined it at length and compared it to the other four known specimens. At that time, it was determined that the Walton specimen was genuine. The coin was sold at Heritage Auctions by the heirs in April 2013 for US$3,172,500, significantly above an estimated value of US$2,500,000. The auction buyers, Jeff Garrett, (former ANA President) and owner of Mid-American Rare Coin Galleries in Lexington, Kentucky, partnering with esteemed numismatist, Larry Lee, put it on display at Lee’s store, Coin & Bullion Reserves in Panama City, Florida. It stayed there, on display for five years, to be viewed by visitors.

In June 2018 Garrett and Lee sold the 1913 Walton, in a private treaty sale reported to be between $3 and $4 million, to Martin Burns, a lawyer from Las Vegas, and his brother Ron Firman, of Miami. PCGS reauthenticated the coin and sealed it in its current PCGS Secure slab (holder). The brothers then arranged for the Walton specimen to come back to the ANA museum, where it had stayed beginning in July 2018.

In October 2022 the Firman family sold the coin to GreatCollections Coin Auctions for US$4,200,000.

== McDermott specimen ==
The McDermott 1913 Liberty nickel

Held by the American Numismatic Association's Money Museum in Colorado Springs, Colorado, the McDermott specimen has the distinction of being the only 1913 Liberty Head nickel with circulation marks on it. Johnson and Newman sold it to James Kelly, who then sold it to J.V. McDermott, whose name ended up as part of the coin's pedigree. He often carried the coin around with him, showing it off to bar patrons and boasting of its extraordinary rarity and value. The coin lost some of its original mint luster in the process, and McDermott eventually protected it in a holder to prevent further wear. After his death, the coin was then sold at auction to Aubrey Bebee in 1967 for US$46,000, who along with his wife donated it to the ANA in 1989, where it is exhibited in the Money Museum.

== In popular culture ==
A 1913 Liberty Head nickel is the target of a theft plot by the antagonists in Season 6, Episode 14, of the television series Hawaii Five-O (1968 TV series), titled "The $100,000 Nickel."

A 1913 Liberty Head nickel is also featured in the Bernie Rhodenbarr novel "The Burglar Who Studied Spinoza" by Lawrence Block.

A missing 1913 Liberty Head nickel also features prominently in the plot of the 1981 The Hardy Boys book "The Vanishing Thieves".
