= First strike (coinage) =

First strike is a marketing term used by third party coin grading services which refers to coins which were struck first by a mint. The U.S. Mint maintains that there is no widely accepted and standardized numismatic industry definition of First Strike coins. Several coin grading companies have decided that a "first strike" coin is one that shipped from the mint in the first month of the new minting.

== Statement ==
The U.S. Mint has stated that they do not keep track of which coins were struck first. The mint has dates on the packaging for the coins, however they also state that the shipping dates do not reveal exactly when the coins were struck.

== Lawsuit ==
In 2006 a Miami lawyer filed a 10 million dollar lawsuit in a Miami court, alleging the "First Strike" label is deceptive. The lawsuit was filed against the two coin grading companies: Numismatic Guaranty Corporation (NGC) based in Sarasota, Florida., and Professional Coin Grading Service, (PCGS) of Newport Beach, California.

In 2007 NGC settled the lawsuit by paying money to collectors and the attorneys. They also designated 447,500 dollars for consumer education.

== Marketing ==
The lawsuit revealed that the designation of "First strike" is essentially a successful marketing tool. There is essentially no way to know when a coin was struck. While PCGS retains the use of the term, NGC has changed their designation from "first strike" to a more accurate description: "Early Release".

== See also ==
- Capped Bust
