= Certified Acceptance Corporation =

Coin certification company

Certified Acceptance Corporation (CAC)
- Type: Private
- Founded: 2007
- Founder: John Albanese
- Headquarters: Far Hills, New Jersey, United States
- Number of locations: 1
- Area served: United States
- Key people: John Albanese
- Website: CACCoin.com

Certified Acceptance Corporation (CAC) is a Far Hills, New Jersey third-party coin certification company started in 2007 by coin dealer John Albanese. The firm evaluates certain numismatically valuable U.S. coins already certified by Numismatic Guaranty Corporation (NGC) or Professional Coin Grading Service (PCGS).

Coins that CAC deems high-end for their grades receive green stickers, which usually add premiums ranging from single digit percentages to 92% or more. Coins that are definitely undergraded -- and would receive at least a green sticker in the next highest grade -- are bestowed gold stickers, which on average increase values up to 90% or more of PCGS/NGC coins already graded the next highest grade.

CAC and certain dealers buy and sell CAC-certified coins via their affiliated 180-plus-member trading network, CDN Exchange. As of September 2015, CAC had purchased over $425 million worth of its stickered coins.

CAC has evaluated over 650,000 certified coins with a value of over $2.9 billion. The company has over 400 dealer members and over 500 collector members. The firm's website maintains a free serial number verification service, which helps deter CAC sticker counterfeiting, and Population Report, which assists in determining coin rarity.

== Overview ==
For tiered fees, CAC examines certain numismatically valuable U.S. coins to determine their quality within their assigned grades. Coins that are solid or high-end for their grades will have a green, tamper-evident holographic sticker affixed to their holders. In the unusual event that a coin is found to be high-end for the next highest grade (or even finer), a gold sticker is affixed instead. Coins deemed to be low-end, average, or over-graded receive no sticker at all. CAC accepts most numismatically valuable coins but not modern or bullion coins.

CAC's founder, John Albanese, is a co-founder of PCGS, started in 1986, and founder of NGC, which began in 1987. Grading standards have changed over the years. Because collectors and dealers have gotten more selective, an informal "sub-grade" system has evolved. "A" coins are the best of the grade, "B" coins are "solid", and "C" coins are at the low end of a particular grade based on the Sheldon scale, e.g., MS-65. CAC stickers are intended to standardize this system. "A" and "B" coins receive a green CAC sticker, whereas "C" coins do not.

CAC has over 400 dealer members and over 500 collector members. The firm has evaluated over 650,000 coin with a market value of over $2.9 billion. CAC-stickered coins almost always fetch premiums, including on eBay and other Internet auctions, and auctions held by the two largest coin auctioneers, Heritage Auctions and Stack's Bowers. Premiums for green sticker coins usually range from single digit percentiles to 92% or more, with gold sticker specimens yielding average premiums of 80% to 90% or more of PCGS/NGC coins already graded the next highest grade. According to dealer Scott Travers:

"Certified coins with CAC stickers have commanded bonus premiums because of the generally accepted perception that they are superior to 'unstickered' coins in the same grade – and coins with gold stickers have been selling for significantly more, often several times as much as coins of the same type, date, and grade that lack a CAC sticker."
"The green CAC are bringing 5 to 15 percent more on average, and coins with gold stickers are selling for roughly 80% to 90% percent as much as those already certified in the next higher grade."

== Services ==
CAC charges a $22 evaluation fee for each coin valued at up to $10,000, and $29 each for more valuable coins. Only authorized dealers and collector members may submit coins. The rest of the public must submit through the former, a directory of which appears on CAC's website, which also lists coins it accepts for certification. CAC has stopped accepting new submitters, but may allow them in the future.

To deter the counterfeiting of its stickers, CAC offers a free Verification Search service on its website: a user inputs a PCGS or NGC coin slab's serial number to confirm its coin's CAC certification. CAC's website maintains a free Population Report of all U.S. coin issues for which it has issued stickers. CAC coins with special designations, such as "Full Bands" for Mercury dimes and "Deep Mirror Prooflike" for Morgan dollars, are also listed. This Report helps assess coins' rarity.

In October 2022, CAC announced they would be launching their own grading service in 2023, with plans to gradually phase out their stickering operations.

== CDN Exchange (formerly Coinplex) ==
In 2011, CAC and a group of coin dealers founded Coinplex, an online coin trading platform for dealers, in order to broaden the trading market for CAC-approved coins. The firm has since changed its name to CDN Exchange, whose dealers are also able to make markets in non-CAC certified coins. CDN Exchange has over 180 member dealers posting more than 121,000 bids totaling nearly $1 billion. CAC has purchased over $425 million worth of CAC coins.

== References and External Links ==
- Sperber, Laura (March 26, 2012). "The Spring Baltimore Show Market Report by Legend Numismatics". Coin Week.

- Duncan, Kathleen (July 24, 2008). "To CAC or Not to CAC ?". Coin Collecting News. Archived from the original on July 2, 2011.
