= Professional Sports Authenticator =

American trading card grading company

- Industry: Collectibles
- Founded: July 1991
- Services: Card Grading
- Parent: Collectors Universe
- Website: psacard.com

Professional Sports Authenticator (PSA) is a US based sports card and trading card grading company.

== History ==
The PSA was founded in July 1991 by David Hall, owner of coin grading company Professional Coin Grading Service (PCGS), as a third-party sports card grader. The business initially struggled because of limited demand from collectors. Some dealers opposed the idea of a third-party grading their cards and refused to use card grading services.

However, the market shifted in part due to the prevalence of dishonesty at trade shows, which caused some buyers to feel uncomfortable because of the risk of counterfeit items.

PSA grew during the dot-com boom, where eBay established itself as an online auction website. This enabled more people to adopt the hobby of buying and selling sports cards. Having a third-party card grader helped ensure card legitimacy. It also allowed potential buyers to get a better sense of a card's value, which was not always apparent from the often low-resolution images in listings.

== See also ==
- Collectors Universe
- List of most expensive CCG cards
- List of most expensive sports cards
