= American Silver Eagle =

Silver bullion coin of the United States

Silver Eagle
- United States
- Value: 1.00 U.S. dollar (face value)
- Mass: 31.103 g (1.00 troy oz)
- Diameter: 40.6 mm (1.598 in)
- Thickness: 2.98 mm (0.1173 in)
- Edge: Reeded
- Composition: 99.9% Ag
- Years of minting: 1986–present (bullion); 1986–2008, 2010–present (proof); 2006–2008, 2011–present (uncirculated)
- Mint marks: none for bullion issues (P, S, W on proof/uncirculated)

Obverse
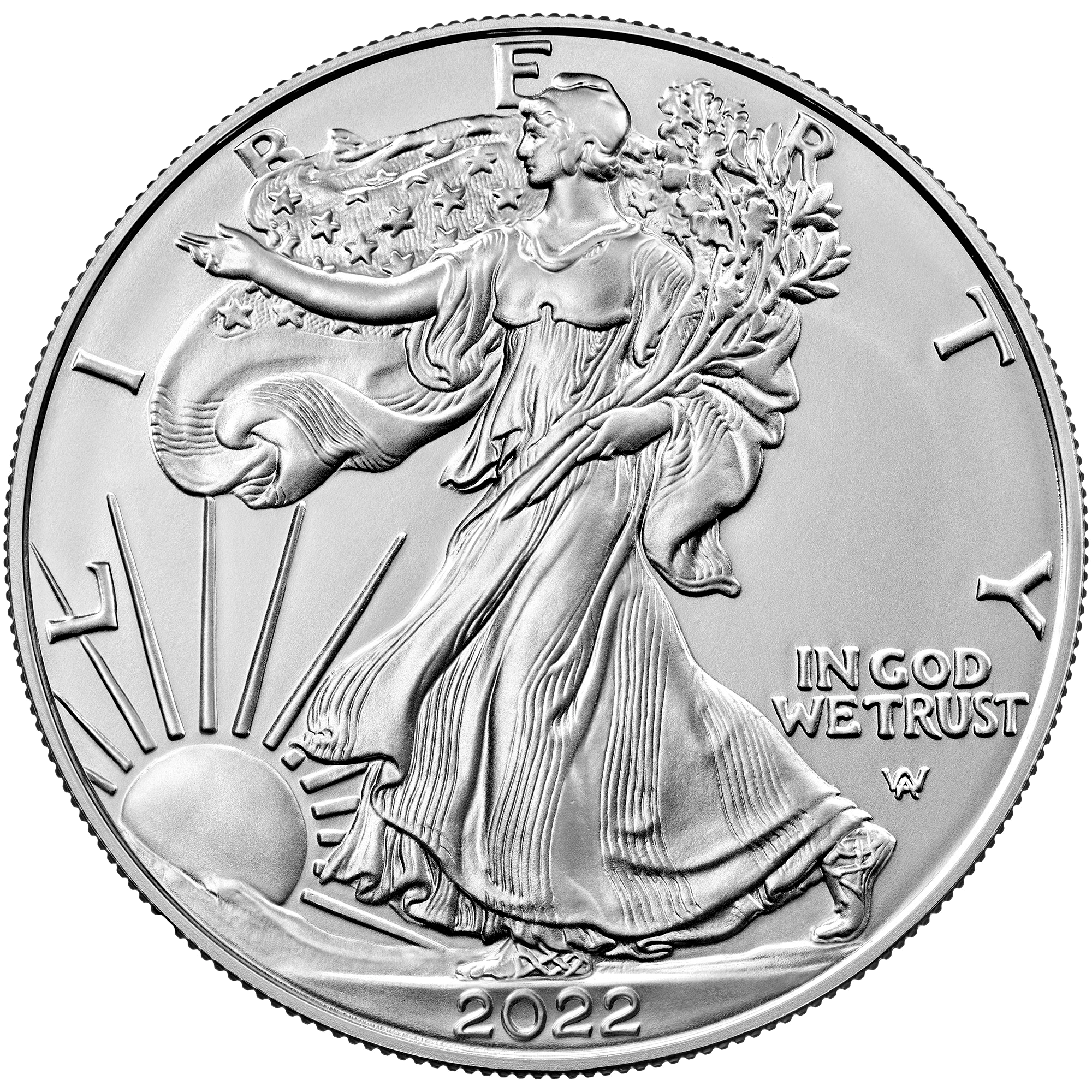
- Design: Walking Liberty
- Designer: Adolph A. Weinman
- Design date: 1916
- Design used: 1986–present

Reverse
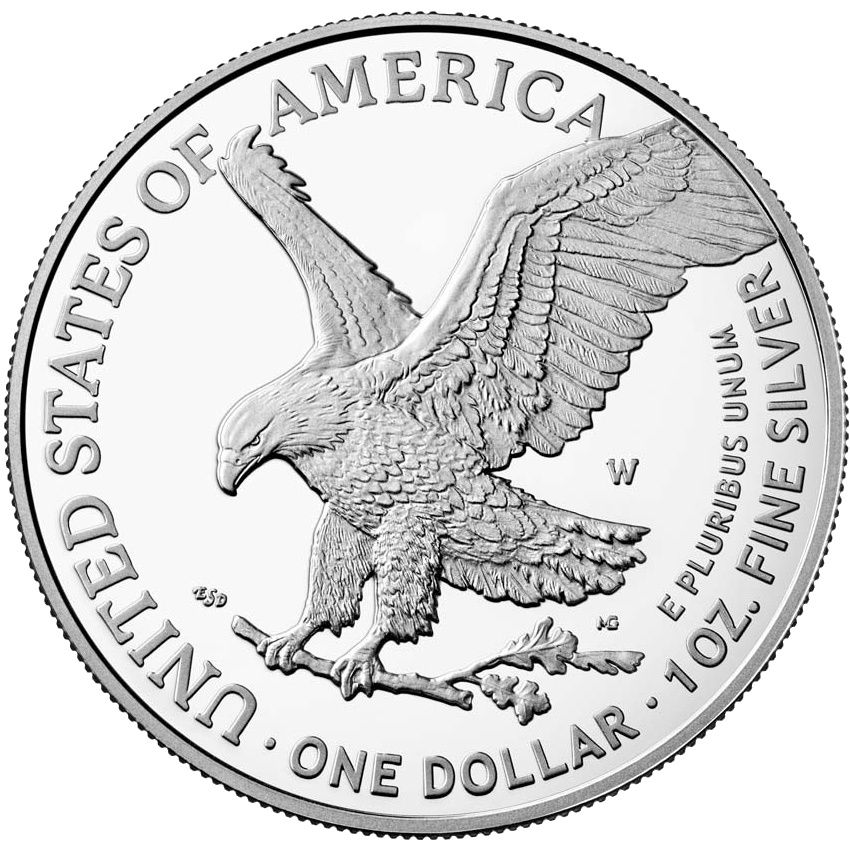
- Design: Bald eagle landing on a branch (Type 2)
- Designer: Emily Damstra
- Design date: 2021
- Design used: 2021–present
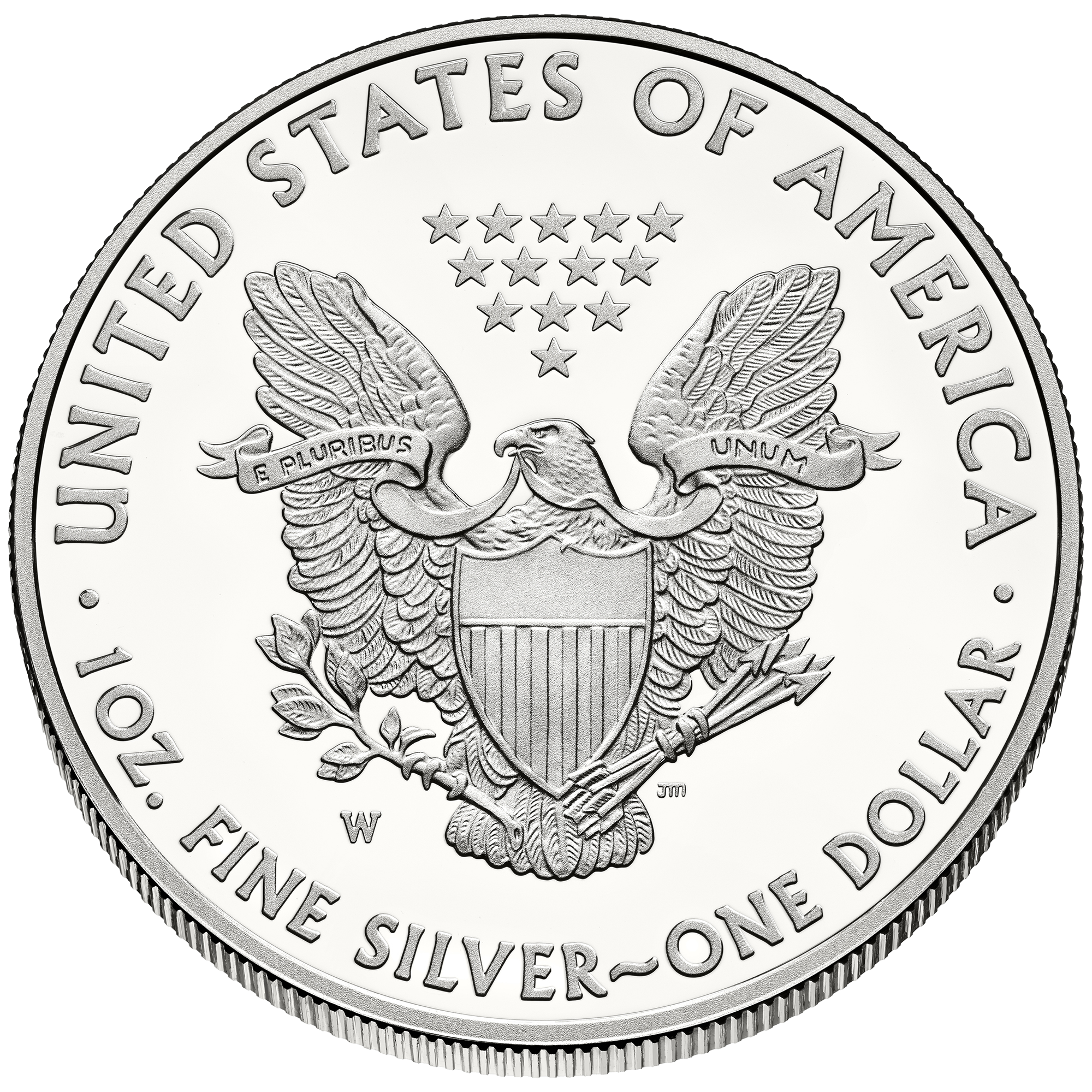
- Design: Heraldic eagle with shield and thirteen five-pointed stars (Type 1)
- Designer: John Mercanti
- Design date: 1986
- Design used: 1986–2021

The American Silver Eagle is the official silver bullion coin of the United States. It was first released by the United States Mint on November 24, 1986, and portrays the Goddess of Liberty in a design by Adolph A. Weinman that was originally used on the Walking Liberty half dollar from 1916 to 1947.

The American Silver Eagle is struck only in the one-troy ounce, which has a nominal face value of one dollar and is guaranteed to contain one troy ounce of 99.9% pure silver. It is authorized by Title II of Public Law 99-61 (Liberty Coin Act, approved July 9, 1985) and codified as 31 U.S.C. § 5112(e)-(h). Its content, weight, and purity are certified by the United States Mint. The melt value of each coin equals the current spot price of one troy ounce of silver, though retail prices typically include a dealer premium above spot. In addition to the bullion version, the United States Mint has produced a proof version and an uncirculated version for coin collectors. The Silver Eagle has been produced at three mints: the Philadelphia Mint, the San Francisco Mint, and the West Point Mint. The American Silver Eagle bullion coin may be used to fund Individual Retirement Account investments.

== Design ==
The design on the coin's obverse was taken from the "Walking Liberty" design by Adolph A. Weinman, which originally had been used on the Walking Liberty Half Dollar coin of the United States from 1916 to 1947. As this iconic design had been a public favorite—and one of the most beloved designs of any United States coinage of modern times, silver or otherwise—it was revived for the Silver Eagle decades later. The obverse is inscribed with the year of minting or issuance, the word LIBERTY, and the phrase IN GOD WE TRUST. The obverse was slightly updated in 2021 (along with the reverse redesign) to feature a new rendering of Weinman's design and the addition of his artist mark under IN GOD WE TRUST.

The newly designed reverse of the 2021 American Silver Eagle (Type 2) was designed by Emily Damstra and shows an eagle landing on a branch; much like that of the reverse of the 1971 Eisenhower Dollar Coins. The reverse is inscribed with the phrases UNITED STATES OF AMERICA, 1 OZ. FINE SILVER•ONE DOLLAR, and E PLURIBUS UNUM, as well as the mintmark if applicable.

From 1986 to 2021, the reverse design was by John Mercanti and portrayed a heraldic eagle behind a shield; the eagle grasping an olive branch in its right talon and arrows in its left talon, echoing the Great Seal of the United States; above the eagle are thirteen five-pointed stars representing the Thirteen Colonies. The reverse was inscribed with the phrases UNITED STATES OF AMERICA, 1 OZ. FINE SILVER~ONE DOLLAR, and E PLURIBUS UNUM (on the banner that the eagle holds in its beak), as well as the mintmark if applicable. The design was slightly modified starting with 2008 coins; most notable is the addition of a serif on the U of UNITED, and a slight change between SILVER and ONE.

== Legislative history ==
=== Background: Defense National Stockpile silver sales ===
The impetus of the American Silver Eagle bullion program ultimately comes from executive plans through the 1970s and early 1980s to sell off silver from the Defense National Stockpile. As The Wall Street Journal explained, "Several administrations had sought unsuccessfully to sell silver from the stockpile, arguing that domestic production of silver far exceeds strategic needs. But mining-state interests had opposed any sale, as had promilitary legislators who wanted assurances that the proceeds would be used to buy materials more urgently needed for the stockpile rather than merely to reduce the federal deficit." Throughout the period, such sell-offs that did occur, as well as announcements of planned sell-offs, caused immediate declines in the price of silver. The Wall Street Journal reported in September 1976, "When the US government makes noises about selling silver from the federal stockpile, futures traders start unloading futures contracts in speculation that such a sale would depress prices."

Despite congressional opposition to the sale of stockpiled silver through early June 1981, the House Armed Services Committee decided on June 10 to approve a Reagan administration request to sell government-owned silver beginning in fiscal year 1982 to help balance the federal budget. In July 1981, the House and Senate agreed to allow the sale of 75% of the stockpiled silver (105.1 million troy ounces) over a three-year period, and in September the price of silver fell 11% in response. Just before the first sale in October 1981, a group of politicians from Idaho—a major silver-producing state—attempted to block the auction, claiming that the sale could have a "disastrous effect" on the United States silver mining industry in general and several Idaho silver mining companies in particular. On December 3, 1981, Senator James A. McClure (R-Idaho) proposed an amendment (S.UP.AMDT.738) to the Department of Defense appropriation bill (H.R. 4995) to end the government's sale of silver "until the President, not later than July 1, 1982, redetermines that the silver authorized for disposal is excess to the requirements of the stockpile." The appropriations bill was signed into law (Public Law 97-114) with the amendment intact, effectively stopping the further sale of stockpiled silver.

=== Coin legislation ===
On May 27, 1982, Senator McClure introduced bill S. 2598, "A bill to provide for the disposal of silver from the National Defense Stockpile through the issuance of silver coins", to "redirect the sale of silver from our national defense stockpile in an effort to minimize its affect [sic] on the already depressed price of silver." An identical companion bill, H.R. 6649, was introduced on June 22 by Representative Larry E. Craig (R-Idaho) but both bills were referred to committees and never were enacted. The Wall Street Journal reported on June 30 that the price of silver "soared after Interior Secretary James Watt announced that sales of the government's silver stockpile will be indefinitely postponed" as the government's legally required study on potential methods of selling the silver had been delayed.

On January 27, 1983, Senator McClure introduced another bill (S. 269) almost identical to S. 2598. As he had in the earlier bill, the senator asked,

... if we are forced to accept a sale, why use the method guaranteed to depress the price and dispose of the silver with the lowest possible return to the taxpayers[?] Why not instead, if we must sell, at least get as much for it as we can? Therefore, today, I am introducing legislation which provides that in the event the President proposes and Congress authorizes the sale of silver from the strategic stockpile, this silver would be sold through the minting and distribution of a silver-bearing coin.

The bill was referred to the Committee on Banking, Housing, and Urban Affairs which held hearings on April 15, 1983, however, it was not enacted.

Some two years later, with sales still suspended, Senator McClure again introduced legislation aimed at requiring potential sales of stockpiled silver to be conducted through the issuance of coins minted from the silver. This time his legislation took the form of an amendment (S.AMDT.418) to H.R. 47, the "Statue of Liberty-Ellis Island Commemorative Coin Act". McClure's amendment—the "Liberty Coin Act"—added a new section (Title II) to H.R. 47. The amendment may be summarized into the following points:

- Authorize the Secretary of the Treasury to mint and issue silver bullion coins
- Coin specifications including diameter, weight, fineness, general design, inscriptions, and edge finish
- Coin sales
- Numismatic and legal tender statuses
- Purchase of silver from stockpile
- Effective date of October 1, 1985, and stipulation that no coins may be issued or sold before September 1, 1986

Proposed on June 21, 1985, the Senate agreed to McClure's amendment by voice vote on the same day and it was added to H.R. 47; the House approved the amended bill three days later and it was signed into law by President Reagan on July 9, 1985. Thus, the authorizing law for the American Silver Eagle bullion program is Title II of Public Law 99-61 (Liberty Coin Act) codified as 31 U.S.C. § 5112(e)-(h).

=== Program extension, 2002 ===
The authorizing legislation for the American Silver Eagle bullion program stipulated that the silver used to mint the coins be acquired from the Defense National Stockpile with the intent to deplete the stockpile's silver holdings slowly over several years. By 2002, it became apparent that the stockpile would be depleted and that further legislation would be required for the program to continue. On June 6, 2002, Senator Harry Reid (D-Nevada) introduced bill S. 2594, "Support of American Eagle Silver Bullion Program Act", "to authorize the Secretary of the Treasury to purchase silver on the open market when the silver stockpile is depleted." The bill was passed by the Senate on June 21 and by the House on June 27 and signed into law (Pub. L. 107–201 (text) (PDF), 116 Stat. 736) by President Bush on July 23, 2002.

== Minting history ==
The first American Silver Eagle coin was struck in San Francisco on October 29, 1986. Secretary of the Treasury James A. Baker III presided over the striking ceremony held at the San Francisco Assay Office. According to a Chicago Sun-Times article, as Baker "reached for the electronic button on press No. 105, he turned to the audience and said, 'I don't need a pick and shovel to start the San Francisco Silver Rush of 1986.'"

=== Bullion ===
Bullion Silver Eagle coins do not have mintmarks. From 1986 to 1998, they were produced at the San Francisco Mint. From 1999 to 2000, they were produced at the Philadelphia Mint and West Point Mint.

In March 2011, the San Francisco Mint conducted trial strikes of bullion Silver Eagle coins in preparation for the resumption of full production later in the spring. The added production capacity provided by the San Francisco Mint supplements the output of the West Point Mint.

=== Proof ===
From 1986 to 1992, proof Silver Eagle coins were minted at San Francisco and these coins bear the "S" mintmark. From 1993 to 2000, they were minted at Philadelphia and these coins bear the "P" mintmark. From 2001 to 2008, they were minted at West Point and these coins bear the "W" mintmark. No proof versions were minted in 2009. In 2010, proof coins were again minted at the West Point mint, bearing the "W" mintmark. Beginning in 2011, proof coins were minted at both the West Point mint, bearing the “W” mint mark, and at the San Francisco mint, bearing the “S” mintmark.

=== Uncirculated ===
From 2006 to 2008 and beginning again in 2011, the United States Mint issued a collectible uncirculated Silver Eagle coin produced at West Point (bearing the "W" mintmark). The coins are struck on specially burnished blanks, commonly referred to as planchets, and sometimes are referred to as "W Uncirculated" or "Burnished Uncirculated". Aside from the standard-issue burnished Eagles, there has been one burnished Eagle issue produced at San Francisco bearing the "S" mintmark for release in the "American Eagle 25th Anniversary Silver Coin Set" in 2011.

=== Special issues ===
==== 1990s ====
- In 1993, the "Philadelphia Set" was issued to commemorate the bicentennial of the striking of the first official United States coins at the Philadelphia Mint in 1793. The set included proof American Gold Eagle coins in 1/2 ozt, 1/4 ozt, and 1/10 ozt sizes, a proof Silver Eagle coin, and a 90% silver proof "U.S. Mint Bicentennial" medal, all with "P" mintmarks.
- In 1995, in addition to the regular proof coin minted at Philadelphia, the United States Mint also issued a proof coin minted at West Point. Known as the "1995-W Proof Silver Eagle", the coin was sold only as part of the "10th Anniversary American Eagle Five Coin Set" which also included the four 1995-W proof American Gold Eagle coins in 1 ozt, 1/2 ozt, 1/4 ozt, and 1/10 ozt sizes; 30,125 sets were sold.

==== 2000s ====
- In 2000, the Mint issued the "United States Millennium Coinage and Currency Set" which included a 2000 Silver Eagle bullion coin minted at West Point (but without a "W" mintmark), a 2000 Denver-minted Sacagawea Dollar with a burnished finish, and an uncirculated 1999 series one-dollar bill with a serial number beginning with the numbers "2000". The sets sold out at the issue limit of 75,000 units. In fewer than twenty known sets, the Sacagawea Dollars do not have a burnished finish.

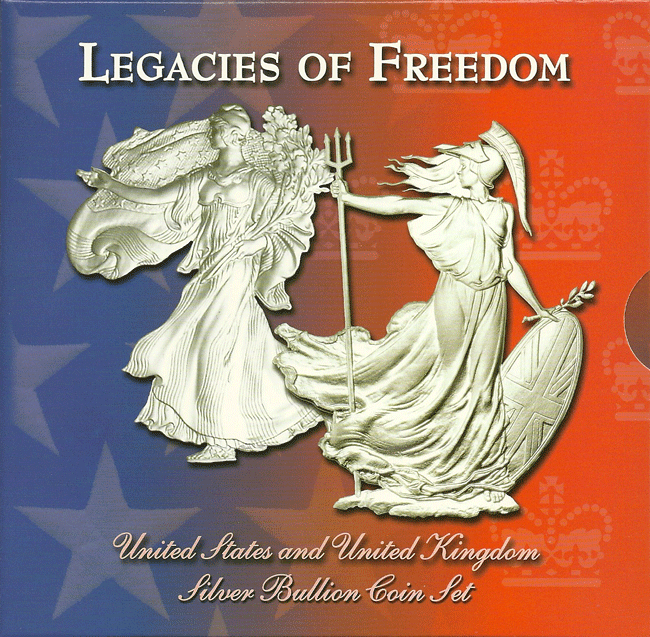
Cover of the "Legacies of Freedom United States and United Kingdom Silver Bullion Coin Set", depicting the obverse for the Silver Eagle and the reverse for the Silver Britannia together.

- In January 2004, the Mint issued the "Legacies of Freedom United States and United Kingdom Silver Bullion Coin Set" which consisted of a 2003 bullion Silver Eagle and a 2002 Silver Britannia bullion coin from the United Kingdom. The set had an issue limit of 50,000.
- To celebrate the 20th anniversary of the American Silver Eagle program in 2006, the Mint issued a special "Reverse Proof Silver Eagle" coin minted at Philadelphia. This coin was available as part of a 3-coin set which also included the regular proof coin and the new "Burnished Uncirculated" coin. The reverse proof coin features a frosted background and mirrored raised surfaces (the opposite of a typical proof coin of the series). Uncirculated Silver Eagle coins also were available as part of the "20th Anniversary Gold & Silver Eagle Set" which had an issue limit of 20,000 (19,145 were sold) and included the one-ounce, 2006-W uncirculated American Gold Eagle.

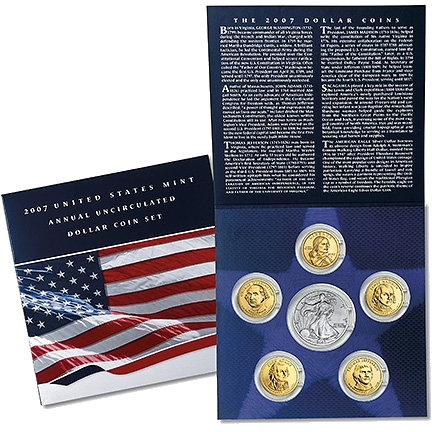
The 2007 "United States Mint Annual Uncirculated Dollar Coin Set" with a Silver Eagle coin surrounded by Presidential and Sacagawea dollars.

- In 2007 and 2008, uncirculated Silver Eagle coins were packaged with each year's issues of Philadelphia-minted Presidential Dollars and Denver-minted Sacagawea Dollars in an "Annual Uncirculated Dollar Coin Set". The 2007 set became available directly from the Mint on December 3, 2007; the 2008 set was available from August 7, 2008 to January 28, 2010.

==== 2010s ====
- In 2011, the Mint issued an "American Eagle 25th Anniversary Silver Coin Set" to celebrate the program's 25th anniversary. The set includes five coins in a lacquered presentation case: one proof coin minted at West Point, one uncirculated coin minted at West Point, one uncirculated coin minted at San Francisco, one reverse proof coin (frosted background with polished, mirror-like design elements/foreground) minted at Philadelphia, and one bullion coin.
- In June 2012, the Mint issued the "San Francisco American Silver Eagle Two Coin Proof Set" to commemorate the San Francisco Mint's 75th anniversary. The set includes a 2012 proof Silver Eagle coin and a 2012-S reverse proof Silver Eagle coin, both minted in San Francisco.
- In August 2012, the Mint issued the "Making American History Coin and Currency Set" which includes a 2012 proof Silver Eagle coin (minted in San Francisco) and a Series 2009 five-dollar bill with serial numbers beginning with "150". The set celebrates the Mint's 220th anniversary and the Bureau of Engraving and Printing's 150th anniversary.
- In November 2012, the Mint offered for sale the "2012 United States Mint Limited Edition Silver Proof Set" which includes a 2012 proof Silver Eagle coin (minted at West Point), five proof 90% silver quarters from the America the Beautiful Quarters program (minted in San Francisco), one 90% silver Kennedy half dollar (minted in San Francisco), and one 90% silver Roosevelt dime (minted in San Francisco).
- In May 2013, the Mint offered for sale the "2013 American Eagle West Point Two-Coin Set" which includes two 2013 Silver Eagle coins minted at West Point: a reverse proof coin and an uncirculated coin enhanced with three finishes (heavy frost, light frost, and brilliant polish).

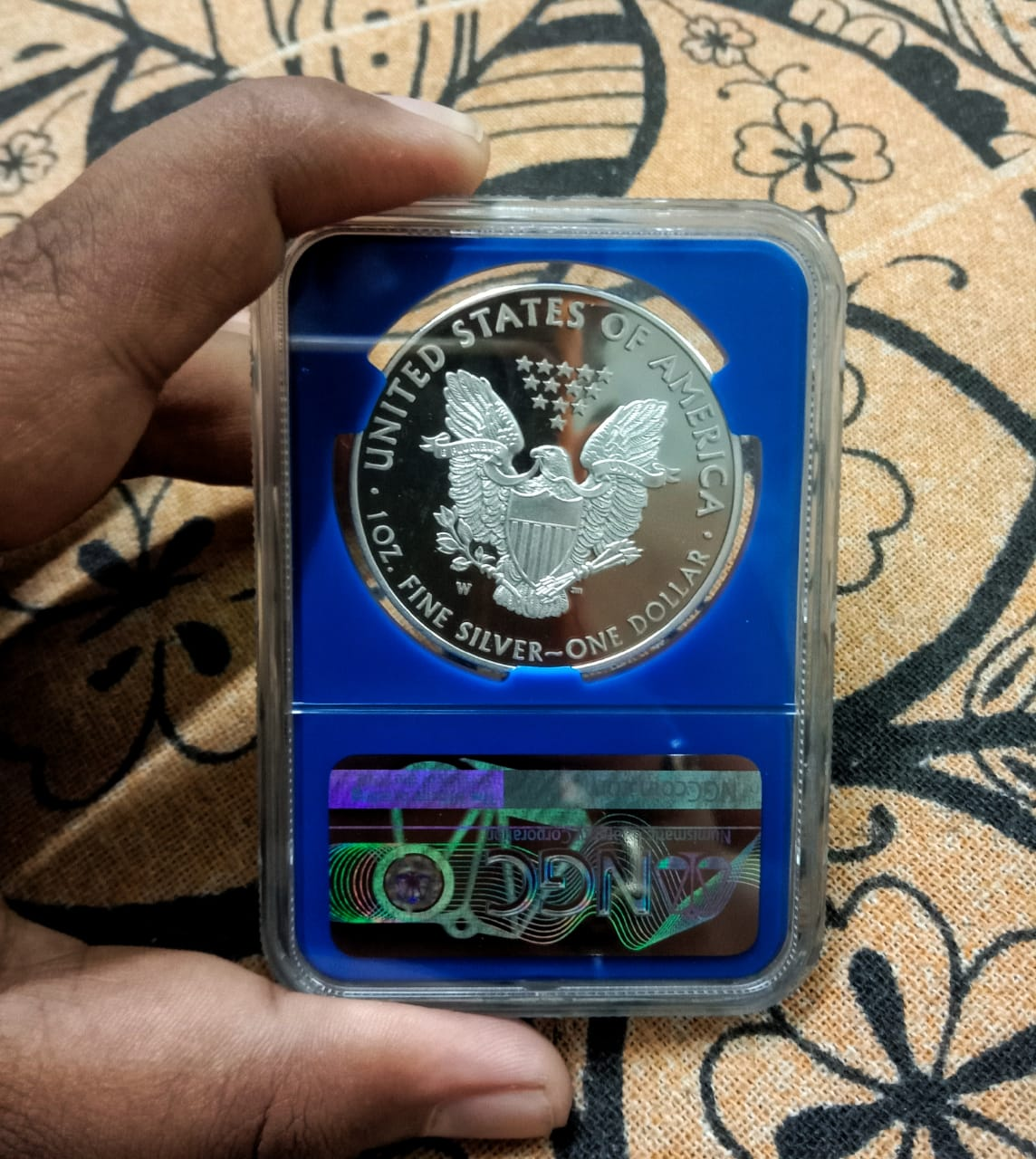
A slabbed 2016 30th Anniversary proof Silver Eagle reverse

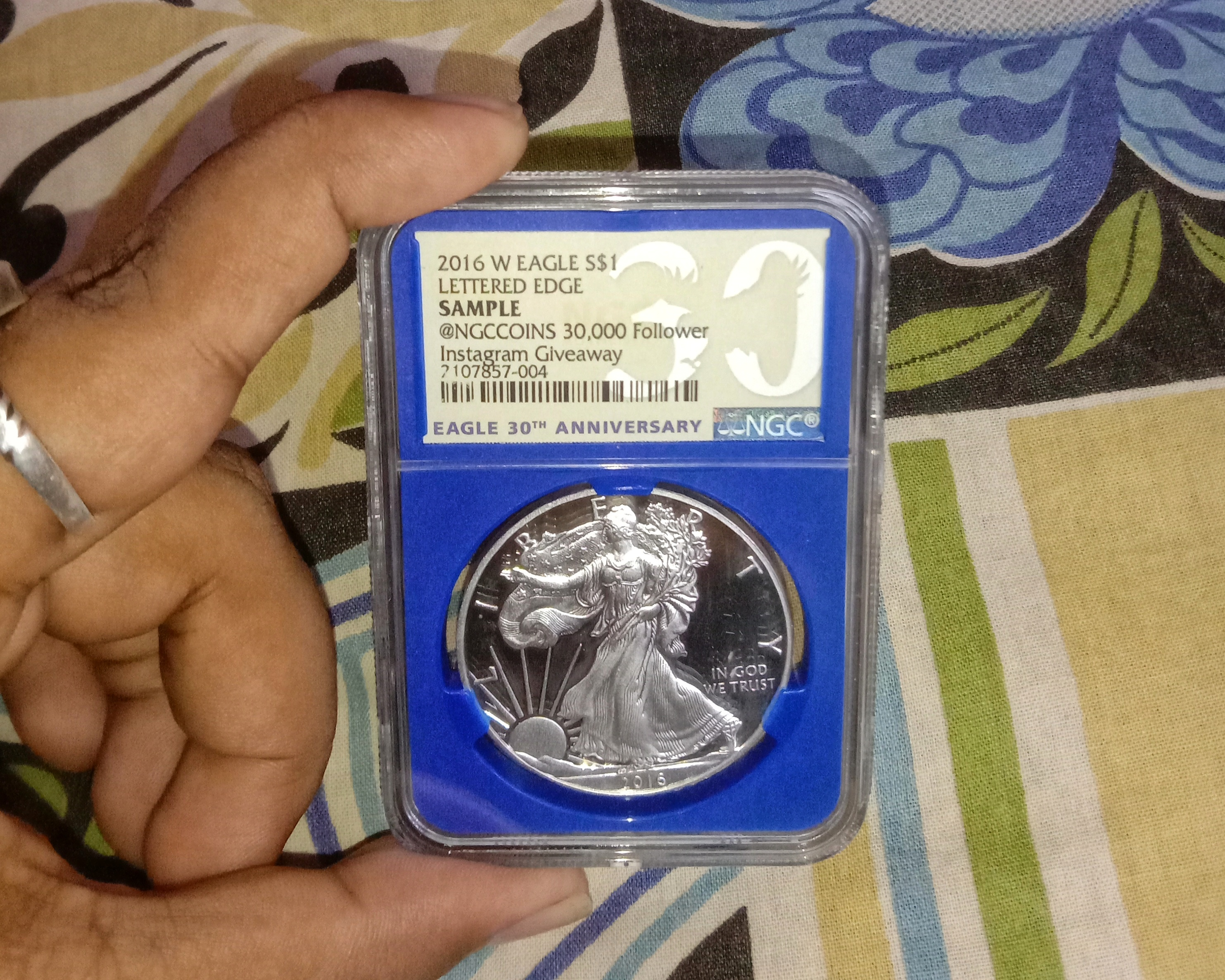
A 2015 American Silver Eagle (Obverse side; Proof "30th ANNIVERSARY" on edge and made of .999 fine silver), in a NGC special slab.

- In 2016, the Mint issued "30th Anniversary" editions of the coin to celebrate the program's 30th anniversary. The coins were produced in both proof and uncirculated versions, and feature a special rim design with the inscription “30th ANNIVERSARY” incused on the edge of the coin, replacing the normal reeded edge. Proof versions went on sale in September 2016, uncirculated versions followed in December. Both were minted at West Point, NY, and bear the "W" mint mark.
- In June 2019, the United States Mint announced a partnership with the Royal Canadian Mint to issue the Pride of Two Nations silver coin set containing special versions of the American Silver Eagle and Canadian Silver Maple Leaf coins. The American coin will be struck at the West Point Mint and will feature a reverse cameo proof finish, while the Canadian coin will be struck at the Ottawa Mint and will feature a modified reverse design and proof finish. The sets will be sold by both mints, with a product limit of 100,000 in the US and 10,000 in Canada.
- On November 14, 2019, the San Francisco mint mark Reverse Proof American Silver Eagles went on sale by the US Mint. These special Silver Eagles only had a mintage of 30,000. This low mintage beat the record set by the 1995-W Proof American Eagle that was released only with the 10th Anniversary Gold Eagle Proof Set and is the lowest mintage of all Type 1 Silver Eagles. This highly sought-after coin was limited by the US Mint to sell only one per customer, making for a chaotic day of release with the website crashing for many customers. The Enhanced Reverse Proof American Silver Eagle was the first numismatic coin offered by the US accompanied by a Certificate of Authenticity with a serial number. Also, these Silver American Eagles bear an "S" mintmark to note that these coins were minted at the San Francisco US Mint facility.

==== 2020s ====
- On November 5, 2020, the Mint issued the "End of World War II 75th Anniversary American Eagle" silver proof coin, along with a gold counterpart. This special coin has a privy mark on its obverse in the shape of a bird's eye view of the Rainbow Pool, along with lettering that says "V75". The silver proofs had a limited mintage of 75,000 coins.
- On September 13, 2021, the Mint issued the “American Eagle 2021 One Ounce Silver Reverse Proof Two-Coin Set Designer Edition.” This set honors the 35th anniversary of the American Silver Eagle Program and the design transition from the 1986 type 1 design to the 2021 type 2 design. The set featured a 2021 Reverse Proof Type 1 from the West Point Mint and a 2021 Reverse Proof Type 2 from San Francisco with a maximum mintage of 125,000 sets.
- On September 27, 2024, a partnership was announced between the Mint and Nice Gang, a mobile video game company, which sees players compete for physical collectibles, including a limited-edition Silver Eagle with a star privy mark. The issue is limited to a release of 50,000 coins, all certified by Numismatic Guaranty Company (NGC).
- For the United States semiquincentennial, various American Eagle silver proof one ounce coins were released, including commemorative editions for each branch of service.

=== Varieties ===
The first significant variety of the Silver Eagle series appeared in 2008 and is known as the "2008-W Silver Eagle Reverse of 2007 Variety". The United States Mint made slight alterations to the reverse design between 2007 and 2008 and some 2008 uncirculated coins inadvertently were struck with the 2007 reverse type die resulting in a die error. The variety is distinguishable by differences in the "U" in UNITED STATES and the dash between SILVER and ONE.

=== Effect of recession on availability, 2008–2010 ===
As a result of the global recession, the demand from investors for bullion coins as a hedge against inflation and economic downturn surged. This increased demand began to affect the availability of American Silver Eagle bullion coins in February 2008 when sales to authorized dealers were suspended temporarily. In March 2008, sales increased ninefold from the month before (from 200,000 to 1,855,000). In April 2008, the United States Mint began an allocation program, effectively rationing Silver Eagle bullion coins to authorized dealers on a weekly basis due to "unprecedented demand". At least one observer has questioned the legality of the allocation program, as the Treasurer of the United States is required by law (31 U.S.C. § 5112(e)) to mint and issue these coins "in quantities sufficient to meet public demand". On June 6, 2008, the Mint announced that all incoming silver planchets were being used to produce only bullion issues of the Silver Eagle and not proof or uncirculated collectible issues. The 2008 Proof Silver Eagle became unavailable for purchase from the United States Mint in August 2008 and the 2008 Uncirculated Silver Eagle sold out in January 2009 (however, it was available as part of the "2008 Annual Uncirculated Dollar Coin Set" until it sold out on January 28, 2010).

On March 5, 2009, the United States Mint announced that the proof and uncirculated versions of the Silver Eagle coin for that year were temporarily suspended due to continuing high demand for the bullion version. The allocation program that had been put in place in March 2008 was lifted on June 15, 2009, leading to speculation that proof and uncirculated versions might be produced before the end of the year. However, on October 6, 2009, the Mint announced that the collectible versions of the Silver Eagle coin would not be produced for 2009. The disappointment of collectors was expressed in a December 1 article by Representative Gary C. Peters (D-Michigan). Peters offered alternative scenarios to the cancellation of 2009 proof and uncirculated Silver Eagles and explained that he would be sending a letter to Mint Director Edmund C. Moy urging him to begin minting these products as soon as possible and continuing to do so until the end of the year. This effort was not successful and the collectible versions were not produced. The sale of 2009 Silver Eagle bullion coins was suspended from November 24 to December 6 and the allocation program was re-instituted on December 7; the product sold out on January 12, 2010.

Production of the 2010 Silver Eagle bullion coins began in January of that year (as opposed to beginning typically in December preceding the year of issue) and the coins were distributed to authorized dealers under an allocation program until September 3.

On July 20, 2010, Mint Director Edmund C. Moy provided testimony to the House Subcommittee on Domestic Monetary Policy and Technology on the matter of proof and uncirculated Silver Eagle coins, referencing the possibility of a legislative solution. Moy explained:

... [B]ecause we could not produce these popular coin products, those who had become accustomed to purchasing them on an annual basis were very disappointed. As Director of the United States Mint, I appreciate the disappointment of these collectors, but I am encouraged to know that the Subcommittee is exploring the possibility of an amendment to the law that would afford the Secretary the authority to approve the minting and issuance of American Eagle Silver Proof and Uncirculated Coins even when we are unable to meet the public's demand for the bullion versions of these coins. American Eagle coin collectors and our many other customers who purchase these products as gifts would likely welcome such a change. Indeed, such a change would be one of the most positive customer satisfaction measures that could be taken to benefit your coin collecting constituents without having an effect on American's [sic] ability to acquire investment-grade silver bullion. We have already provided you technical drafting assistance that your staff have requested to accomplish this change; however, such a change needs to be enacted soon. We can mint 200,000 per month, and if we can begin by September, we will be able to produce about 830,000 one-ounce silver American Eagle coins to meet collector demand for this product in the remaining months of 2010.

— Edmund C. Moy, Testimony of Edmund C. Moy, Director United States Mint, Before the Subcommittee on Domestic Monetary Policy and Technology, United States House of Representatives, July 20, 2010

On September 22, 2010, Representative Melvin L. Watt (D-North Carolina) introduced the "Coin Modernization, Oversight, and Continuity Act of 2010" (H.R. 6162) to amend 31 U.S.C. § 5112 (e) and (i) by giving the Secretary of the Treasury authority to mint American Eagle silver and gold coins in "qualities [e.g. bullion, proof, or uncirculated] and quantities" sufficient to meet public demand. The bill was signed into law (Pub. L. 111–302 (text) (PDF)) by President Barack Obama on December 14, 2010.

On October 4, 2010, the Mint announced that 2010-dated proof American Silver Eagle coins would be available for purchase beginning on November 19, 2010, at a price of $45.95 per coin and that 2010-dated uncirculated Silver Eagle coins would not be produced.

=== 2013–2015 availability ===
In January 2013, the Mint suspended sales of American Silver Eagle bullion coins after the first week due to high demand. The Mint resumed the allocation program that had been implemented from 2008 to 2010.

The Silver Eagle coins were sold out in the first week of July 2015. The Mint said its facility in West Point, New York, continued to produce coins and it resumed sales at the end of July 2015. This was the second time the mint's silver coins had sold out in the past nine months. The Mint ran out of 2014-dated American Eagles in November 2014. In 2013, the historic drop in silver increased demand for silver coins, forcing the mint to ration silver coin sales for 18 months.

=== Impact of COVID-19 on production, 2020 ===
On March 28, 2020, the West Point Mint, believed to be the only producer of bullion American Silver Eagles from 2018 up until early 2020, was shut down for cleaning after an employee tested positive for SARS-CoV-2. The facility reopened on April 1, and bullion coin production was reduced to prevent employee exposure to COVID-19, before once again being shut down on April 15 due to safety concerns.

To make up for the reduced and later suspended production of silver bullion coins, the Philadelphia Mint struck 240,000 American Silver Eagles from April 8 through April 20, making them among the rarest uncirculated issues to date. Although these coins were physically identical to the West Point coins, coin grading companies began certifying Philadelphia Mint Silver Eagles as "Emergency Issues". Production at West Point continued on April 21.

== Distribution ==
=== Bullion ===
Sales of American Silver Eagle bullion coins began on November 24, 1986, and initial inventories sold out "immediately due to the phenomenal demand".

Silver Eagle bullion coins, along with American Gold Eagle bullion coins, were planned as "viable investment alternatives to the gold and silver bullion coins produced by other countries. ..." To ensure wide distribution of the coins, the United States Mint awarded a contract to Grey Advertising to assist in marketing and publicizing the coins domestically and internationally. Advertising efforts were expanded in fiscal years 1987 and 1988.

Like the American Gold Eagle and American Platinum Eagle bullion coins, Silver Eagle bullion coins are not sold directly to the public by the United States Mint. In order to provide "effective and efficient distribution, which maximizes the availability of the coins in retail markets as well as major investment markets" the Mint utilizes a network of "authorized purchasers" to distribute the coins. The coins are sold in bulk at a premium ($2.00 per coin effective October 1, 2010) over the spot price of silver. The coins are sold to banks, brokerage companies, coin dealers, precious metal firms, and wholesalers that meet the following requirements:

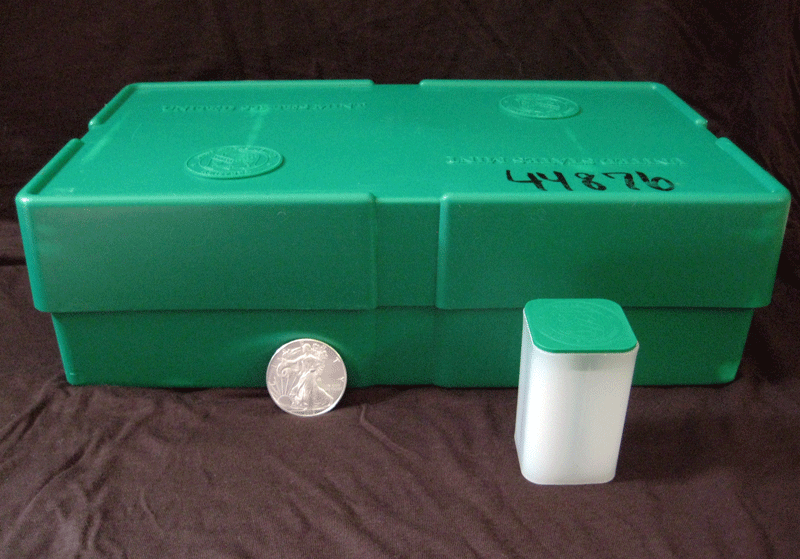
A green plastic box used by the United States Mint for shipping American Silver Eagle bullion coins. Each "monster box" holds 25 smaller plastic tubes (shown) which hold 20 coins each for a total of 500 coins.

- Be an experienced and established market maker in silver bullion coins
- Provide a liquid two-way market for the coins
- Be audited annually by an internationally accepted accounting firm
- Have an established broad base of retail customers to which to distribute the coins
- Have a tangible net worth of $5 million (this requirement may be met using a letter of credit)

Authorized purchasers must order a minimum of 25,000 coins which they sell to secondary retailers that sell them, in turn, to the public. When sales of Silver Eagle bullion coins began in November 1986, the Mint had approved twenty-eight authorized purchasers to market the coins throughout the world.

Bullion coins are shipped in so-called "monster boxes". Each green plastic box holds 500 coins which are packaged in 20-coin plastic tubes. On the lid of each box are two raised Department of the Treasury seals and the phrase "United States Mint" in raised lettering. Before shipping, the boxes are sealed with straps by the Mint and labeled with the year of issue and a serial number.

=== Proof, uncirculated, and special issues ===
Proof American Silver Eagle coins dated 1986 through 2008 were sold directly to the public by the United States Mint at a fixed price. The coins were packaged in a protective plastic capsule mounted in a satin-lined, velvet-covered presentation case and accompanied by a certificate of authenticity. Proof Silver Eagle coins first became available through the United States Mint's subscription program in October 2002. Uncirculated coins dated 2006 through 2008 were sold directly to the public by the United States Mint in packaging similar to that of the proof coins; however, the 2006 coin's capsule was housed in a velvet drawstring bag. Special issues and sets are sold directly to the public by the United States Mint.

== Value ==
American Silver Eagle bullion coins carry a face value of US$1. This is their legal value reflecting their issue and monetization as coins. Per 31 U.S.C. § 5112(h), the coins are legal tender for all debts public and private at their face value. This value does not reflect their intrinsic value which is much greater than their $1 legal tender face value. American Silver Eagle Coin prices and premiums are mainly dictated by the fluctuating silver spot price and ongoing supply-demand.

Mintages, and thus prices, of bullion, proof, and uncirculated Silver Eagle coins have varied widely, and the potential collector is advised to check a standard reference book before buying them. Generally, the bullion versions have been minted in the millions, while the proof and uncirculated versions were issued in the hundreds of thousands each. Most dates of the bullion issue are not particularly expensive (around $25 as of September 2016) and are traded at a premium above the intrinsic value of the silver they contain; most proof versions (around $65–$75 as of 2016) and uncirculated versions (around $25–$75 as of 2016) sell for more. Some issues sell for significant sums, for example, the 1995-W proof ($3,800 as of 2016) and the 2006 20th anniversary set containing a special "Reverse Proof" coin along with a regular proof coin and the new "Burnished Uncirculated" coin ($250 as of 2016).

== Security features ==
Counterfeit coins, especially from China, are a problem as they are illegal and fraudulent. To deter counterfeits and keep the integrity of its product, the American Silver Eagle bullion coin incorporates several security features to ensure its authenticity and deter counterfeiting attempts.

Firstly, the coin possesses reeded edges, which are grooves along the perimeter, serving as a visual and tactile authentication measure. This technique discourage attempts to steal metal from a coin through clipping or filling as it makes any tampering obvious. Coins produced from 2021 have a further anti-counterfeiting feature of a missing reed or notch on its edge that changes depending on the mintage year of the coin.

Additionally, the use of advanced technology has resulted in intricate designs and high-definition details, such as the finely engraved inscriptions and the realistic rendering of the Walking Liberty image.

Furthermore, the Silver Eagle features a unique mint mark, indicating the specific U.S. Mint facility responsible for its production. This mint mark further enhances the coin's traceability and helps verify its origin.

== See also ==
- American Silver Eagle mintage figures
- America the Beautiful silver bullion coins – United States silver bullion coin program
- American Buffalo (coin) – United States gold bullion coin program
- American Gold Eagle – United States gold bullion coin program
- American Platinum Eagle – United States platinum bullion coin program
- American Palladium Eagle – United States palladium bullion coin program
- Britannia (coin) – British silver bullion coin program
- Bullion coin
- Canadian Silver Maple Leaf – Canadian silver bullion coin program
- Silver as an investment
- United States dollar coin
