= Third-party grading =

Grading of collectible items by an independent service

Third-party grading (TPG) refers to the grading of collectibles. It initially started with coin grading & banknote grading authentication, attribution, and encapsulation by independent certification services, but today, third-party grading as expanded to other collectibles such as sports cards, video games, and stamps.

These services will, for a tiered fee depending on the value of the coin, "slab" a coin and assign a grade of 1–70 on the Sheldon grading system, with 1 being the lowest grade, with only faint details visible to 70, a practically perfect, uncirculated coin with no scratches or wear. If a coin is determined to have been cleaned, altered or damaged in the past, the coin will still be given a general grade, such as Good or Very Fine, but will not be given a numerical rating on the Sheldon scale. These coins are commonly referred to as “details” coins and usually have lower value to collectors.

American Numismatic Association Certification Service (ANACS) 1979, Professional Coin Grading Service (PCGS) 1986, Numismatic Guaranty Corporation (NGC) 1987, and Independent Coin Graders (ICG) 1998, are the most popular and well-known services. Together they have certified over 100 million coins.

Certified Acceptance Corporation (CAC) is a coin certification service which evaluates certain high-end coins already certified other firms and assigns a CAC approval to the coin's slab if it meets certain standards based on the coin's eye appeal, strike and visual appearance. Coins with the CAC sticker are usually valued higher than those without CAC approval.

== History ==
Modern third-party coin grading service is presently defined by the tamper-resistant plastic "slab," which encapsulates both the item and its certification. Before photographs and encapsulation there was no way to permanently tie the certificate to the actual item being certified. It was possible to submit a superior coin for certification and then sell a similar, but inferior, coin with the certificate issued for the more valuable one. This was the problem faced by the Institute of Numismatic Authenticators, founded by the controversial Walter H. Breen in 1962. The company lasted little more than a year.

A decade later, the American Numismatic Association (ANA) established their Certification Service, the ANACS, in 1972. At first, the coins were not graded, only confirmed as genuine. Coins were returned with a photo certificate but not encapsulated. Originally located in Washington DC, the ANACS moved to Colorado Springs in 1976. The Official American Numismatic Association Grading Standards for United States Coins was published in 1977, providing the basis for ANACS's expansion from authentication only to into grading in March 1979.

The move from photo certificates to slabs came in 1984, with a now defunct company called Accugrade. Their early slabs are notable for containing both the coin and a photograph of the coin, clearly illustrating the transition from photo certificates to slabs. PCGS began operations in 1986, providing encapsulation in a modern plastic slab without a photograph. Their first-generation holder is known as the Old Green Holder (OGH) or "rattler," because of its label color and the fact that coins would rattle inside. NGC commenced business in 1987. ANACS provided both photo certificates and/or slabs in 1989. ICG was established in 1998. Many other companies have provided similar services, but most are no longer in business, and all have certified far fewer coins. Today, some people have begun collecting some of these early slabs from defunct companies not for the coins, but for the historical value of the slabs themselves.

Along with coins, other items later started to be graded. NGC's parent company is by Certified Collectibles Group, which includes Paper Money Grading (PMG), and a stamp grading company, and the first comic book grading company, Certified Guaranty Company, which now has several competitors.

A more recent development has been the advent of "stickering" services, such as Certified Acceptance Corporation (CAC). These companies do not slab coins themselves, but rather provide a second opinion on already slabbed coins, adding a sticker to slabs that they consider to be on the high end of their grade.

== Leading services ==
There are four (six for Canada) coin certification services which eBay, the largest coin marketplace, deems acceptable to include in its listings: ANACS, ICG, NGC, and PCGS (also ICCS and CCCS for Canadian coins). Experts consider these to be the most credible and popular services. Together they have certified over 80 million coins.

In 2007, the rare coin industry's leading dealer association, the Professional Numismatists Guild (PNG), released the results of a survey of major coin dealers who gave their professional opinions about 11 certification services. PCGS and NGC were rated "Superior" overall, with ANACS and ICG deemed "Good". PCI and SEGS were listed as "Poor", while called "Unacceptable" were Accugrade (ACG), Numistrust Corporation (NTC), Hallmark Coin Grading Service (HCGS), American Coin Club Grading Service (ACCGS), and Star Grading Services (SGS).

NGC and PCGS counterfeit holders have been reported, but significant measures have been taken by both services to remedy the problem, such as NGC's use of photographic verification for every coin certified and both services' employment of serial number verification and anti-counterfeiting features in their holders.

== Process ==
At each of the four main grading companies, a similar process is used. Each coin is graded (on a verbal and numerical scale from 1 to 70) and authenticated by two or more graders, and then assigned a final grade by a finalizer, based in part upon the recommendations of the prior graders. Depending on the company, various descriptors may be added, such as Full Bell Lines (FBL) for Franklin half dollars or Deep Mirror Prooflike (DMPL) for Morgan dollars, and the coin's die variety may be noted. The coin is then slabbed and returned to the customer.

Comic books used to be graded same as books, with grades described Firsts Magazine and The Overstreet Comic Book Price Guide and eventually some new grades (very fine, near mint) and by the 21st century, grades from 0.1 to 10.0 (similar to 1 to 100 except normally 10.0 isn't used because of often-unavoidable minor handling/manufacturing contamination/damage, and only certain numbers tend to be used, such as multiples of 0.5 approximating sub-grades of older grades that are words but still used).
