= Paper currency grading =

Process of determining the condition of a bank note

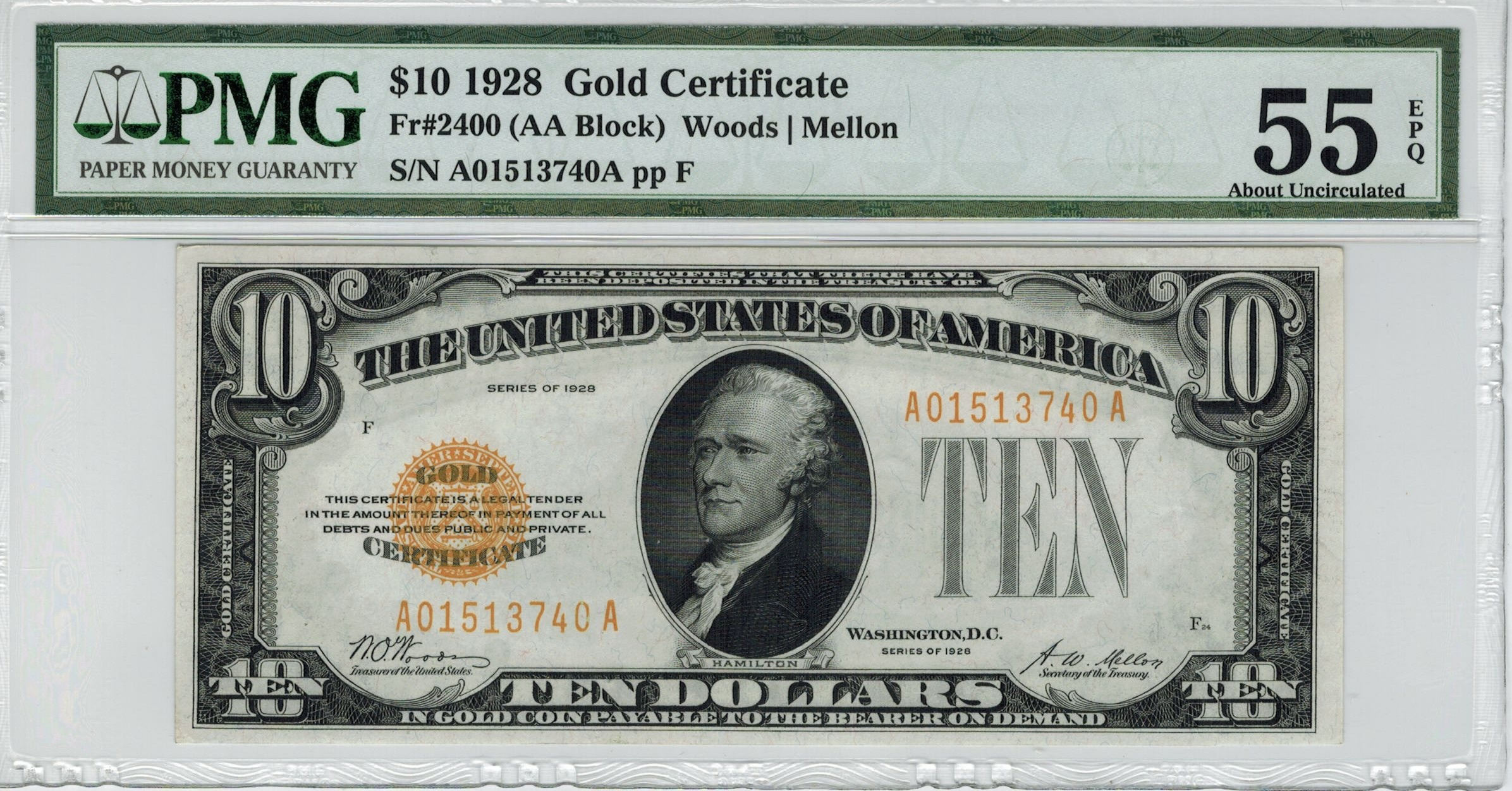
1928 United States ten dollar gold certificate PMG graded 55 EPQ

Paper currency grading is the process of determining the grade or condition of a bank note, one of the key factors in determining its collectible value. A banknote's grade is generally determined by crispness (rigid, not limp paper), brightness, and depth of color. Other factors that are taken into consideration include centering of the printed area, artificially suppressed folds, repairs, and pinholes. Certification services professionally grade banknotes for tiered fees.

== United States ==
United States banknotes are graded by a system much like the 70 points Sheldon coin grading scale which is used for coins. Top-quality grades include "Gem" or "Choice" condition which is usually dubbed as "New" by sellers down to "poor" for notes barely identifiable. Paper money, in general, can become "ugly" over time which in turn affects eye appeal and value as it does with coins.

=== Circulated grades ===
#	Grade	Grade code(s)	Description
1	Poor	PO	Note is mostly in one piece, but is a badly worn "rag". The note may have staining, pieces missing, graffiti, and/or larger holes present. The tape used to hold pieces of the note together and edge trimming may also be present. In this grade skilled restoration is often done to preserve rare issues. Some examples might include National gold bank notes
2	Fair	FR	Note is mostly intact but can have large pieces torn or missing. Likely problems in this grade include; holes, stains, tears, and splits. Notes in this condition are generally not collectible unless they are rare.
3	About Good	AG	In this grade, the note will be very well worn, small pieces may be missing. Notes in this condition are generally not collectible unless they are rare.
4	Good	G	Note will be very heavily circulated and lack eye appeal. These "Good" graded notes are fully limp and badly worn. Prolonged circulation causes "strong multiple folds and creases, stains, pinholes and/or staple holes, dirt, discoloration (faded), edge tears, and rounded corners." These notes are commonly found with graffiti, and small pieces missing which may include the corners.
6	Good	G	Notes in this grade are very worn with wear. A small piece from the edge/corner may be missing, or a small internal hole may be present with serious splits, and fraying of the margins.
8	Very Good	VG	In this grade the note is heavily circulated/worn but is intact. Slightly rounded corners, frayed edges, or slightly rough margins may be present with splits, and light stains common. Small pieces such as a corner tip may be missing, and the note will be limp.
10	Very Good	VG	Very good 10 is considered an intermediate grade, the note is fully intact but has minor problems. Notes that fall into this category may include those that just miss the next grade up because of a "heavy fold or two with isolated soiling" or overly worn areas.
12	Fine	F	Notes in this grade have spent a considerable time circulating, as a result, the note will still be solid but some of the body of the paper will be lost. The corners may be slightly frayed or rounded, the edges may be frayed, minor edge splits may be present, and pinholes may be visible but none should be distracting. No major damage such as tears or stains should be on notes in this grade.
15	Fine	F	Notes in this grade will have a good body, sound paper, bright colors, and above-average eye appeal but miss the next grade up due to too many folds or too much circulation. Folds cause a loss of paper durability which may be present in isolated areas.

== See also ==
- Coin grading
- Coin slab
- Numismatics
