= Coin capsule =

Plastic holder for collectible coins

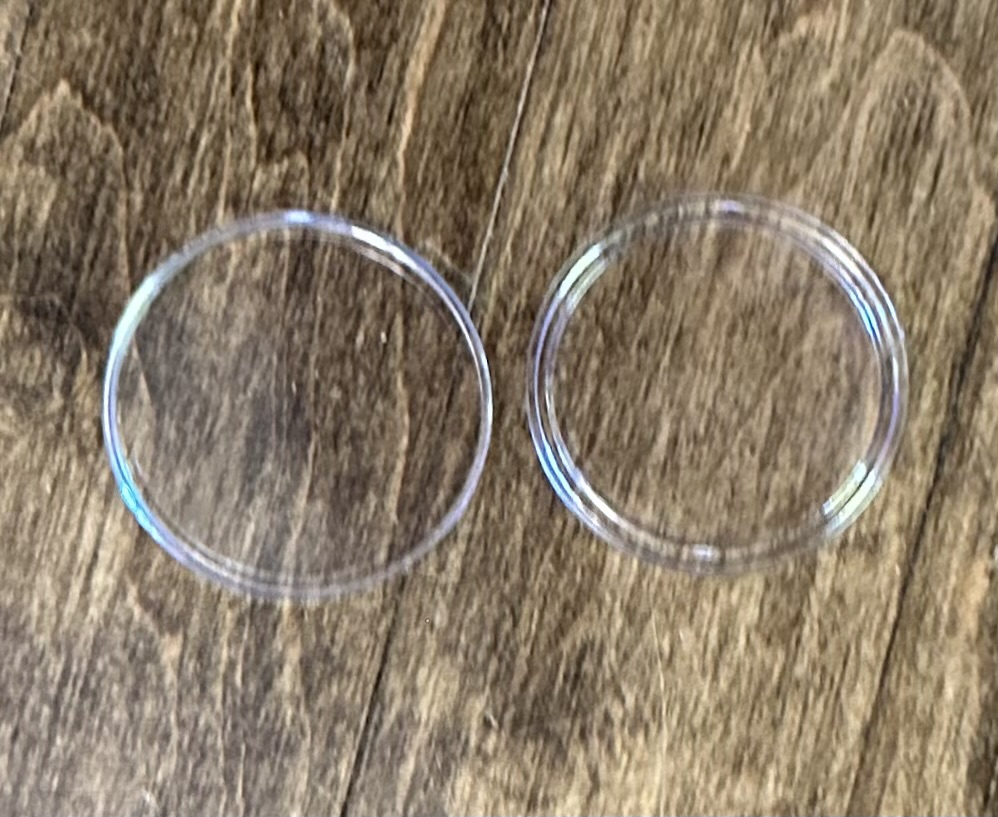
Two halves of a coin capsule

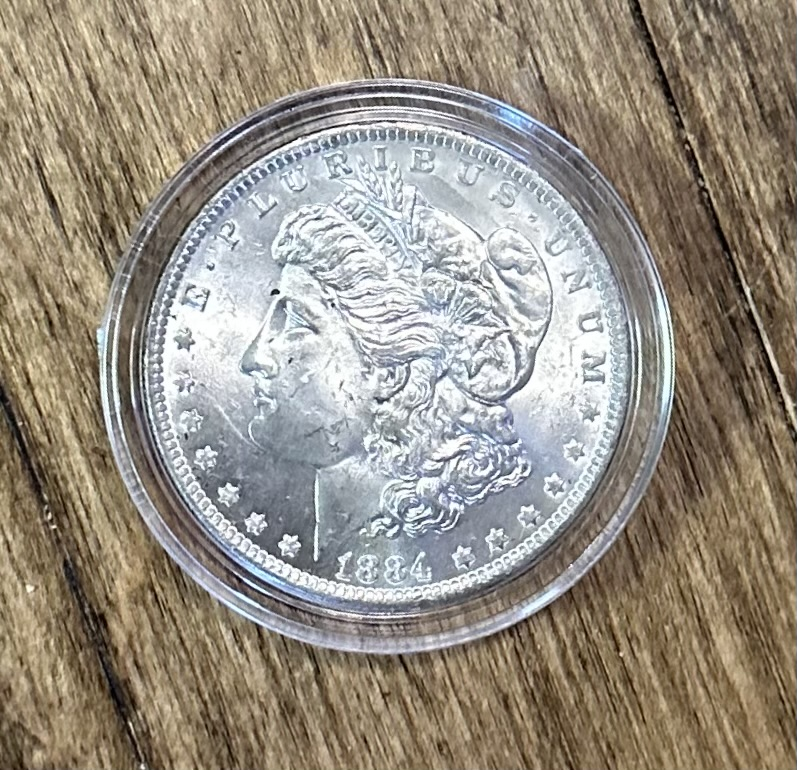
1884 Morgan Dollar in a coin capsule

A coin capsule or is a type of plastic capsule designed to prevent coins from becoming damaged by protecting it from outside contaminants, scratches and drops while allowing the coin to be viewed through transparent plastic.

== History ==
Similar to capsules, Coin slabs are a way to encapsulate coins commonly used by coin grading services; coin capsules are used by coin collectors, or numismatists to store and keep coins safe. The varied nature of coin sizes has led to a wide range of differently sized capsules becoming available each offer different levels or protection or security. Some types of capsules are designed with the ability to be reopened while others, once closed cannot be reopened without damaging the capsule. Many capsules now come with adjustable foam inserts in order to prevent inserted coins from moving around inside the capsule. Starting from 20mm, they can vary in sizes, including 31mm, 35mm, 44mm and 50mm.
