= ICCS =

ICCS stands for:

- Intercollegiate Center for Classical Studies, Italy
- International Catholic Conference of Scouting
- International Coin Certification Service, Canada
- International Commission of Control and Supervision, United Nations
- International Commission on Civil Status, Europe
- International Council for Canadian Studies
- International Classification of Crime for Statistical Purposes, a crime classification standard; see National Crime Records Bureau
