= Collectors Universe =

American authentication company

Collectors Universe Inc.
- Type: Private
- Traded as: Nasdaq: CLCT (1999–2021)
- Industry: Business Services
- Founded: 1986; 40 years ago
- Headquarters: Santa Ana, California, United States
- Key people: Nat Turner (CEO, and Chairman); Naeem Ishaq (CFO, and President) (October 2026)
- Revenue: $75.17M (January 2020)
- Number of employees: 450+ (January 2020)
- Website: www.collectors.com

Collectors Universe Inc. is an American company formed in 1986, now based in Santa Ana, California, which provides third-party authentication and grading services to collectors, retail buyers and sellers of collectibles. Its authentication services focus on coins, trading cards, sports memorabilia, and autographs. The company reached the combined total of 75 million certified collectibles in 2019. Collectors Universe is also a publisher in fields relating to collecting.

The company engages in business-to-business market for certified coins under Certified Coin Exchange, and a business-to-consumer under Collectors Corner. PCGS Coin Authentication and Grading Services focuses on coins market and have authenticated and graded over 42.5 million coins, medals, and tokens with an estimated market value of over $36 billion.

== History ==
In 2000, Collectors Universe acquired James J. Spence, Jr.'s sports autograph authentication company and later acquired privately held Odyssey Publications Inc.

In February 2009, Collectors Universe sold its currency authentication and grading division to a new company formed for the acquisition. On January 30, 2019, it took back the division and has rebranded it PCGS Banknote.

In October 2012, Collectors Universe's division Professional Coin Grading Service (PCGS) authenticated the 25 millionth coin (PCGS Secure Plus MS65) from Japan, being a historical milestone of the company performance. Professional Sports Authenticator (PSA) focuses on sports and trading cards market. PSA/DNA Autograph Authentication and Grading Services focuses on the autographs and memorabilia market. In the publishing field, the company publishes Rare Coin Market Report and Sports Market Report monthly.

During the 2020 COVID-19 pandemic in the United States, Collectors Universe Inc. requested and secured a $4,204,300 forgivable loan under the Paycheck Protection Program set up by the US Congress and signed by President Donald Trump. Collectors Universe Inc. returned the loan money they had received back to the treasury by May 2020.

In November 2020, it was announced that Collectors Universe would be taken private in a $700 million all-cash buyout by hedge fund manager Steve Cohen, D1 Capital Partners, and collector Nat Turner in the first quarter of 2021. Among the reasons for the purchase was increased interest in collecting by consumers during the COVID-19 pandemic.

Collectors Universe acquired Wata Games in July 2021. Wata Games, since around 2018, had become the video game industry's leading evaluator for video game collectibles, typically evaluating the condition of sealed games before they were auctioned for sale by Heritage Auctions.

== Acquisitions ==
In 2023, Collectors, acquired Sportscard Grading Corporation (SGC), expanding its presence in the sports card grading market. Financial terms of the transaction were not publicly disclosed. Following the acquisition, SGC’s sports card grading operations were integrated into PSA.

In 2025, Collectors acquired Beckett, a longtime competitor of PSA in the card grading and authentication industry. Financial terms of the acquisition were not disclosed. Beckett continues to operate as an independent brand within Collectors, with no immediate changes to pricing or operations. The acquisition includes Beckett’s Comic Book Certification Service, while Southern Hobby Distribution and Dragon Shield were excluded from the deal.

As of 2024, Beckett ranks third in market share among card grading companies, behind PSA and CGC, according to industry data from GemRate. Despite its smaller market share, Beckett is noted for its stringent grading standards and established reputation in the authentication sector.
