= Numismatic Guaranty Company =

American coin certification organization

- Company type: Private
- Industry: Collectibles
- Founded: 1987, Parsippany, New Jersey
- Headquarters: Sarasota, Florida
- Area served: Worldwide
- Services: Coin certification
- Parent: Certified Collectibles Group, owned by Blackstone Inc
- Website: www.ngccoin.com

Numismatic Guaranty Company (NGC) is an international third-party coin grading and certification service based in Sarasota, Florida. It has certified more than 60 million coins. NGC certification consists of authentication, grading, attribution, and encapsulation in clear plastic holders. NGC is a subsidiary of Certified Collectibles Group (CCG), which owns six collectible certification services and is in turn owned by Blackstone, a multibillion-dollar New York City hedge fund.

== History ==
NGC was founded in 1987 in Parsippany, N.J. by John Albanese, who also founded Professional Coin Grading Service. A majority stake was later purchased by coin dealer Mark Salzberg. Salzberg is one of five partners in the CDN Greysheet a price guide for coins similar to the Kelley Blue Book. NGC commenced operations at its new location in Sarasota, Florida in 2002. In 2005 World Class Grader Ron Drzewucki was bought on as a Finalizer and became a shareholder and was involved until 2012. In 2006, NGC relocated to a 60,000-square-foot secure building that also houses its CCG-owned sister companies, including Numismatic Conservation Services (NCS), Paper Money Guaranty (PMG), Certified Guaranty Company (CGC), Certified Sports Guaranty (CSG), and Classic Collectible Services (CCS). In 2008, ancient coin certification began (NGC Ancients). NGC has other locations in Hong Kong, China; Shanghai, China; Munich, Germany; and London, United Kingdom. In 2021 Certified Collectibles Group was acquired by Blackstone. Also in 2021, owner Mark Salzberg's son Andrew was appointed Executive Vice President of NGC.

== Claimed endorsements ==
In 1995, NGC was named the official grading service of the ANA, though this is purely for marketing purposes as the ANA does not encapsulate coins in its collection. In 2004, NGC became the approved grading service of the PNG.

== NGC certification ==
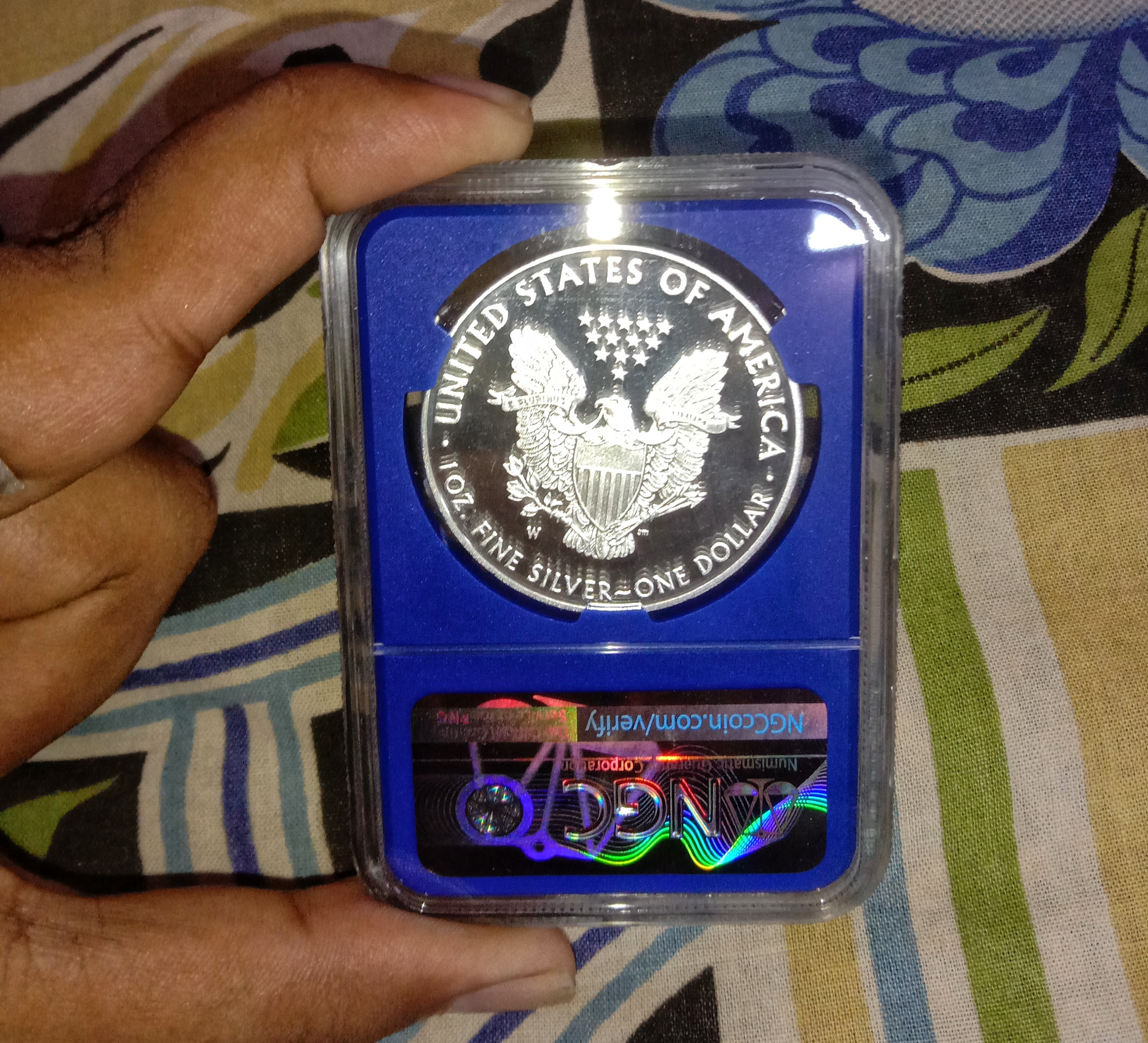
2015 American Silver Eagle (Reverse side; Proof "30th ANNIVERSARY" on edge and made of .999 fine silver), in an NGC slab.

NGC certifies most US, world, and ancient coins, tokens, and medals. The certification process consists of authentication, grading, attribution, and encapsulation in plastic holders or Coin slabs. Certification fees are tiered according to value, turnaround times, and extra services. NGC has certified over 50 million coins. NGC certification offers significant protection against counterfeiting, misattribution, overgrading, and damage, but does not necessarily determine exact value. Even within the same grade, coins can have widely differing values. In the May 26, 2003 edition of Coin World, the hobby newspaper had announced they had contracted investigators to conduct a year-long, comparative study of PCGS, ACCGS, and NGC, along with several other grading services, each known as Third Party Grader (TPG). In their investigation, Coin World sent the same coins to each grading service over the course of a year, each coin being graded by all Third Party Graders it was sent to. They found that "In no case did the grading services agree on the grade of any given coin, and in some cases the difference in grading was as much as seven points off".

The NGC grading scale is based on the 70-point Sheldon coin grading scale. Strike designations include Prooflike and Deep Prooflike for circulation issue coins and Cameo and Ultra Cameo for Proof coins. Coins deemed high-end for their particular numeric grade receive a "Plus" designation. Coins considered attractive get a "Star" moniker. Cleaned, scratched, or otherwise impaired coins can be encapsulated and assigned a verbal "details" grade, but not a numerical one. Additional information is also given for graded and labeled mules and mint errors, specifying the particular error in addition to a numerical grade.

NGC has used EdgeView Holders since 2007 for the Presidential Dollar series and for all other coins since 2008. Since 2009, a scratch-resistant holder coating, similar to that used on eyeglass lenses, has been employed. NGC offers Oversize holders for coins larger than 45 mm and up to 120 mm, and Mega holders for coins larger than 120 mm and up to 180 mm. NGC's label lists a coin's denomination, variety, grade, pedigree, serial number, and other info.

== Online research tools ==
NGC Cert Lookup verifies all NGC-certified coins and helps combat holder counterfeiting. Using the label serial number, NGC will reveal a coin's date, denomination, grade, photo (if any), and pricing and Census info. NGC Coin Explorer lists key info about many coin issues, such as mintages and values. The NGC Census reports how many examples of each issue NGC has certified by grade, which helps determine relative rarity. Census figures are often falsely inflated due to resubmissions of the same coins. NGC Coin Price Guide lists pricing data for most US coin (and some modern Chinese) issues. NGC Auction Central reports auction prices realized.
