= ANACS (coin grading company) =

Coin certification company

American Numismatic Association Certification Service
- Trade name: ANACS
- Company type: Private
- Industry: Coin grading and authentication
- Founded: June 1972
- Founder: American Numismatic Association
- Headquarters: United States
- Area served: Worldwide
- Products: Coin grading, authentication, certification
- Parent: Formerly American Numismatic Association; sold to Coin World publisher in 1989

The American Numismatic Association Certification Service, better known as ANACS, is a coin grading company founded in 1972.

== History ==
Originally founded in June 1972 as the American Numismatic Association's authentication service, ANACS expanded into third-party coin grading in March 1979. ANACS was founded in response to the rise in counterfeit and altered coins in the numismatic marketplace. During the coin collecting boom of the 1960s, counterfeiters would alter common-date coins, and either add or remove a mintmark in order to sell the coins as their more-valuable counterparts. (For example, an 'S' mint mark would be added to a 1909 VDB Lincoln cent in order to increase the coin's value by making collectors think it was a genuine 1909-S VDB cent). ANA sold ANACS to the publisher of Coin World in 1989, and it has since been resold.
