= Coin slab =

Type of sealed coin holder

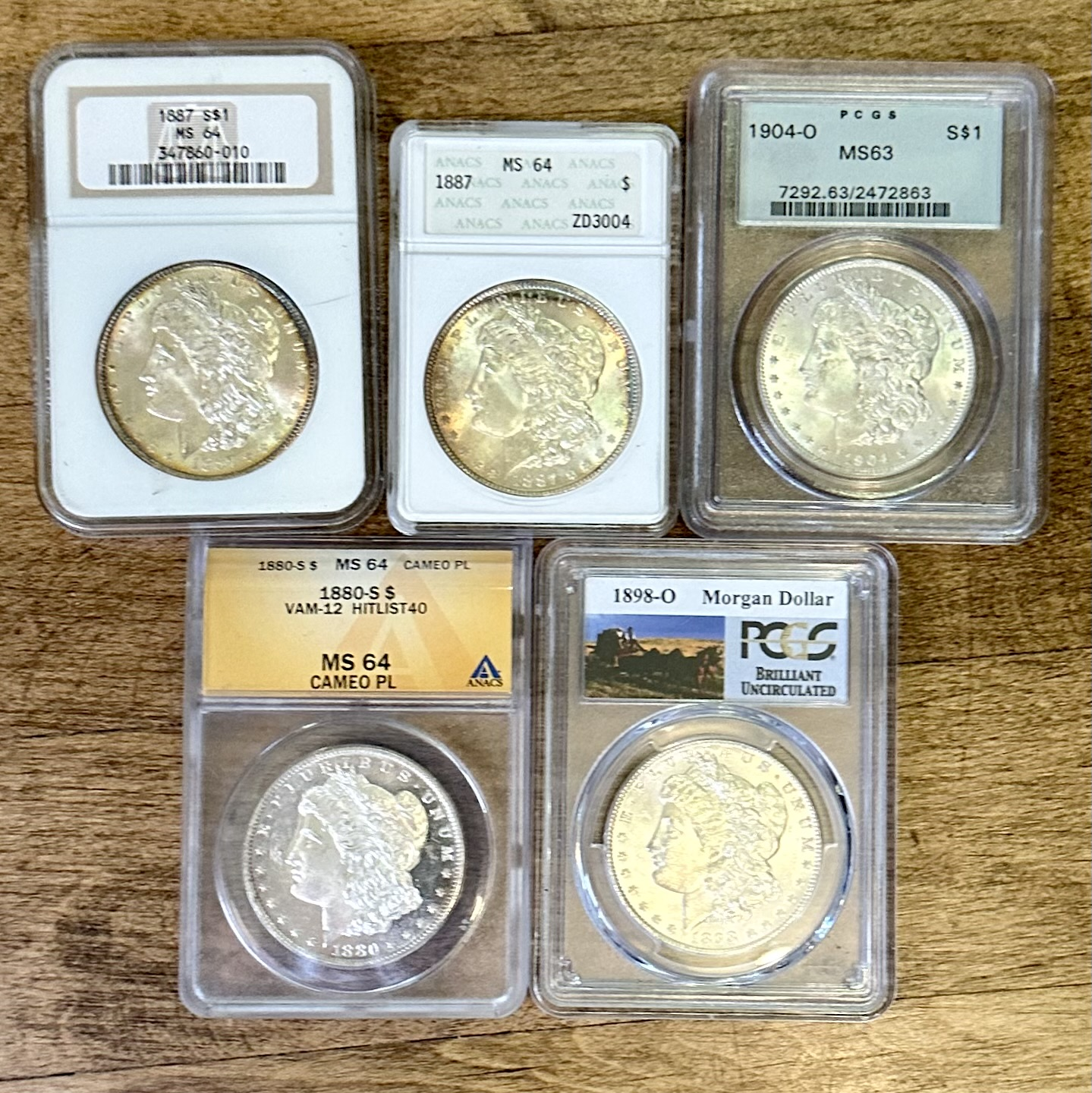
Graded Morgan dollars within a variety of coin slabs. Top left NGC, ANACS, PCGS, bottom left ANACS, PCGS

A coin slab is a type of holder for a coin. Slabbed coins are typically from coin grading companies. The practice of sending coins to third-party grading companies and then "slabbing" them began in 1986.

When a grading company grades a coin, it is sealed in a tamper-proof slab with a barcode and a hologram. To prevent counterfeiting, holograms were attached to the graded coin slabs beginning in 1989. Earlier coin slabs did not have a hologram.

== History ==
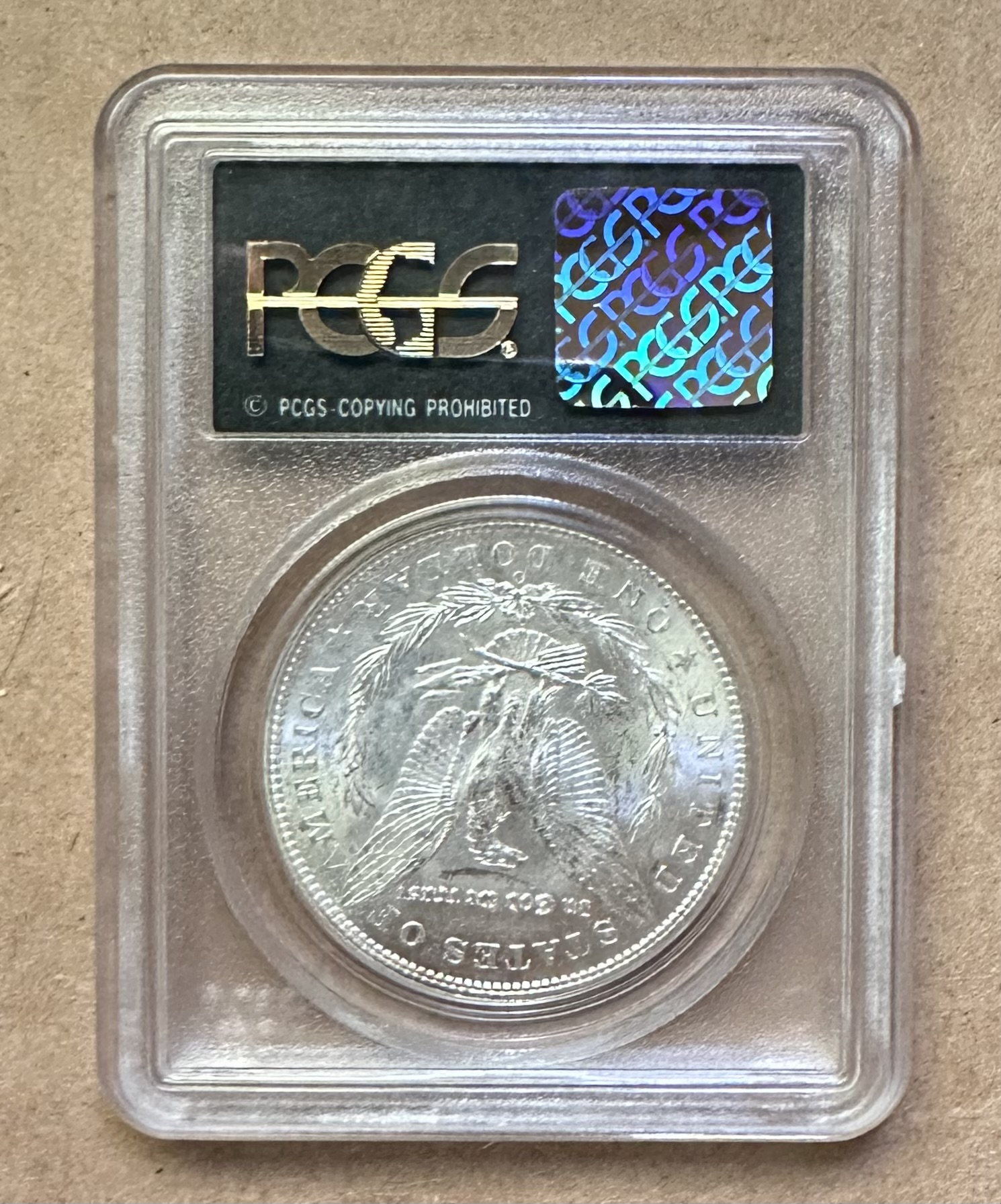
Reverse of PCGS coin slab with hologram in upper right corner

Slabbing coins is a practice which began in 1986. The grading of coins was a way to remove coin grading controversies by having a third party certify the coin's condition. The earliest coin slabs introduced by PCGS were in use from 1986-1989. Collectors refer to these early PCGS slabs as "rattlers". They were nicknamed rattlers because the coin was not firmly positioned in the holder; coins rattled inside the holders. The holder consisted of a thin plastic shell and the specifics about the coin and grade were printed on a dot matrix printer. In September 1989, PCGS introduced a new holder that more firmly held the coin.

There are major coin certification companies that encapsulate coins in an acrylic case after grading the coin. Companies like ANACS, Numismatic Guaranty Company (NGC), Professional Coin Grading Service (PCGS), International Coin Certification Service and CAC accept coins which they grade, certify and then slab. Collectors rely on these third party grading companies to certify coins. After the coins are reviewed and certified a holographic label is attached to the slab. The earliest coins that were slabbed by the major coin grading companies did not have holograms. PCGS began adding a hologram to the reverse of their holders in 1989. NGC began adding a hologram to their coin slabs in 1990.

== Counterfeit slabs ==
Counterfeiters have duplicated coin slabs from major grading companies. In 2023, CoinWeek reported counterfeit 1881 CC Morgan dollar “PCGS” slabs. In 2018, Coin World numismatic magazine reported that counterfeit PCGS slabs complete with holograms were being sold on the website AliExpress. They reported that the real slabs are "sonically sealed" but fake slabs snap together. The magazine also reported the discovery of a fake South African gold Krugerrand which was in a counterfeit NGC slab with a hologram.
