= Sheldon coin grading scale =

70-point coin grading scale

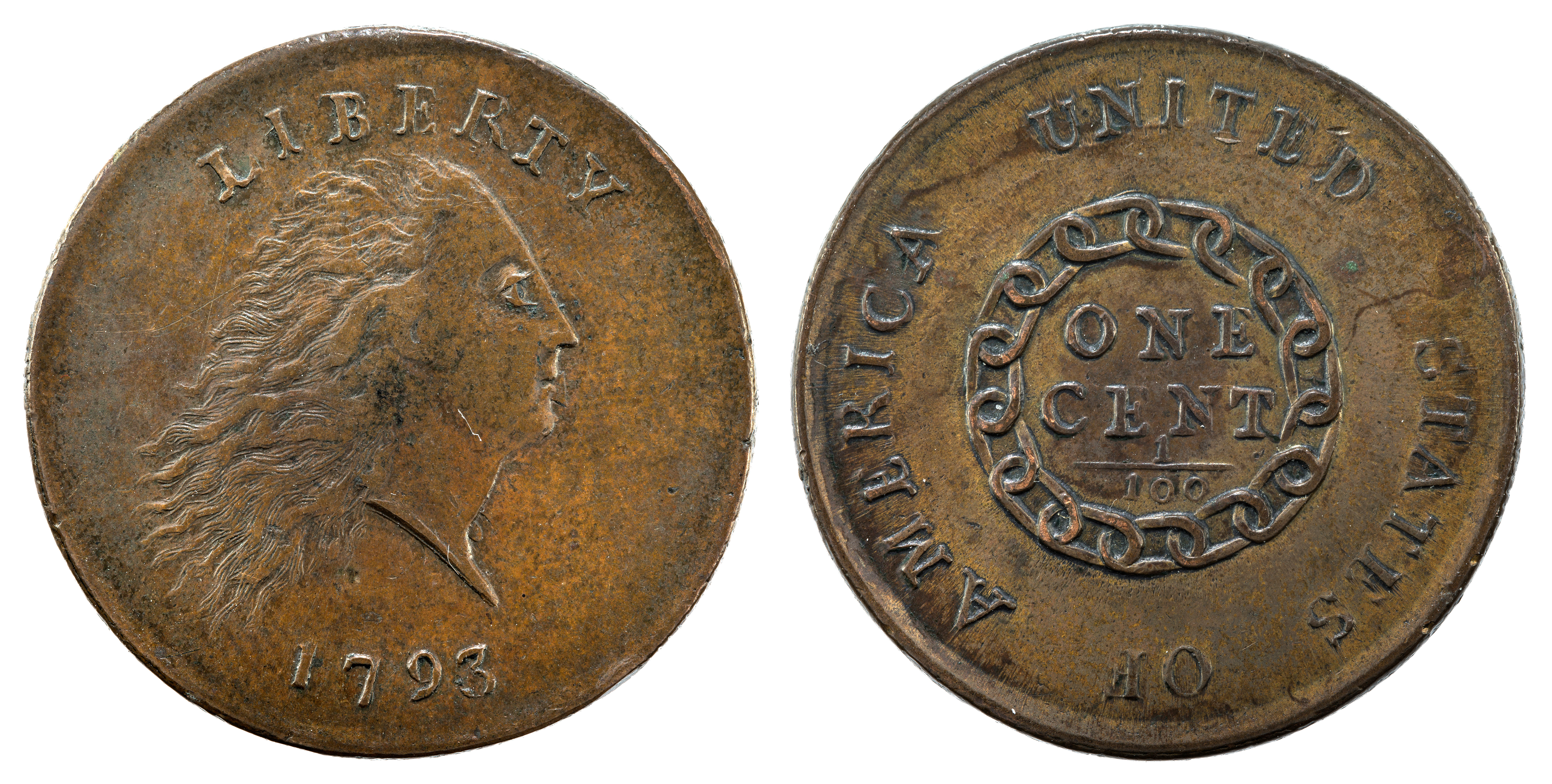
Example of an Early American Cent - the coins that inspired Sheldon to create a more precise grading scale. (Courtesy of the National Numismatic Collection, National Museum of American History [photograph by Jaclyn Nash].)

The Sheldon Coin Grading Scale is a 70-point coin grading scale used in the numismatic assessment of a coin's quality. The American Numismatic Association based its Official ANA Grading Standards in large part on the Sheldon scale. The scale was created by William Herbert Sheldon.

== Original Sheldon Scale (1949) ==
In 1949, the original scale was first presented in Dr. William H. Sheldon's Early American Cents, 1793–1814 titled "A Quantitative Scale for condition" as a way to grade large cents. The scale is known today as the Sheldon scale.

#	Grade
1	Basal State
2	Fair
3	Very Fair
4, 5, 6	Good
7, 8, 10	Very Good
12, 15	Fine
20, 30	Very Fine
40	Extremely Fine
50	About Uncirculated
60, 65, 70	Mint State

== Adapted scale (1970s–present) ==
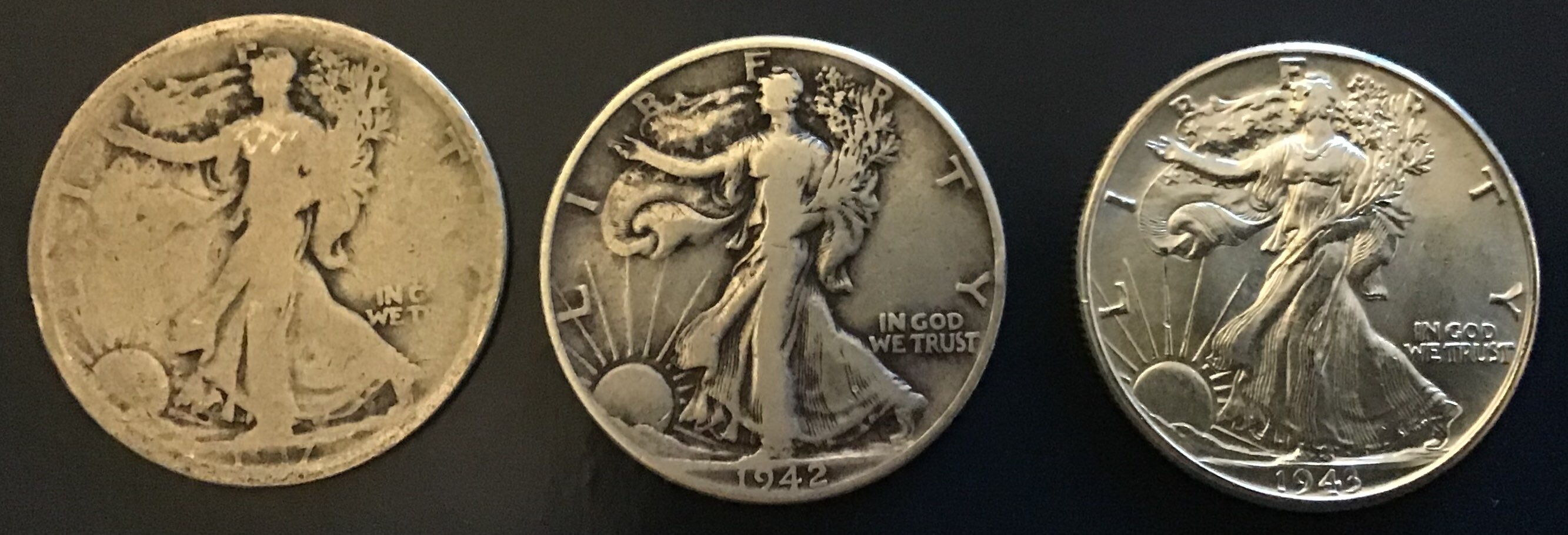
A selection of three Walking Liberty half dollars of various coin grades and years, ranging from AG (About Good) to AU (Almost Uncirculated).

By 1953 the original Sheldon scale had become outdated. It was not until the 1970s, however, that the ANA chose to adapt the scale for use on all US coins. The scale used today is a modification of the original Sheldon scale, with added adjustments, additions, deletions, and modifications to it.

Note: Some early American coin varieties are almost always found to be weakly struck in places. This does not bring the grade of these coins down as in some cases no flawless coin exists for the variety. Early coins in general usually have planchet quality issues which depending on severity and market conditions can bring the grade down for other coins.

=== Circulated grades ===
#	Grade	Grade code(s)	Description
1	Poor	PO	Clear enough to identify, date may be worn smooth with one side of the coin blanked. Coins that are very badly corroded may also fall under this category.
2	Fair	FR	Some detail shows
3	About Good	AG	Readable lettering although very heavily worn. The date and design may be worn smooth.
4	Good	G, G4	Rims of the coin are slightly worn, design is visible, but faint in areas, with many parts of the coin worn flat. Peripheral lettering nearly full.
6	Choice Good	G+, G6	Rims of the coin are complete. Peripheral lettering is full.
8	Very Good	VG, VG8	Slight detail shows, with two to three letters of the word LIBERTY showing in coins with this feature.
10	Choice Very Good	VG+, VG10	Slightly clearer design-features, with five or possibly six letters of the word LIBERTY showing in coins with this feature.
12	Fine	F, F12	Some deeply recessed areas show detail. All lettering is sharp. The letters in the word LIBERTY show completely in coins with this feature, but may be weak. Moderate to considerable, but even wear throughout the coin.
15	Choice Fine	F+, F15	Slightly more detail in the recessed areas of the coin.
20	Very Fine	VF, VF20	Moderate wear on the higher surface features.
25	Very Fine	VF25	All lettering and major features are sharp. Light to moderate, but even wear is seen on the surface and high points of the coin.
30	Choice Very Fine	Ch.VF, VF+, VF30	All lettering and major features are sharp. Light, but even wear is seen on the surface and high points of the coin.
35	Choice Very Fine	Ch. VF, VF+, VF35	All lettering and major features are sharp. Light, but even wear is seen on the surface and high points of the coin. Traces of mint luster may show.
40	Extremely Fine/Extra Fine	Ex. Fine, EF40	Overall sharpness. Light wear seen at the highest points of the coin. Details of the coin are sharp. Traces of mint luster may show.
45	Choice Extremely Fine	Ch. Ex. Fine, EF45	Slight, overall wear is seen at the highest points of the coin (examples being raised features). All the details are full and very sharp. Mint luster may show only in protected areas of the coin's surface (Such as between the star points).
50	About Uncirculated/Almost Uncirculated	AU, AU50	Traces of wear at the highest points of the coin. At least half of the original mint luster remains.
55	Choice About Uncirculated	Ch. AU, AU55	Three-fourths of the original mint luster remains.
58	Choice About Uncirculated	Ch. AU, AU58	Almost all of the original mint luster remains

=== Uncirculated grades ===
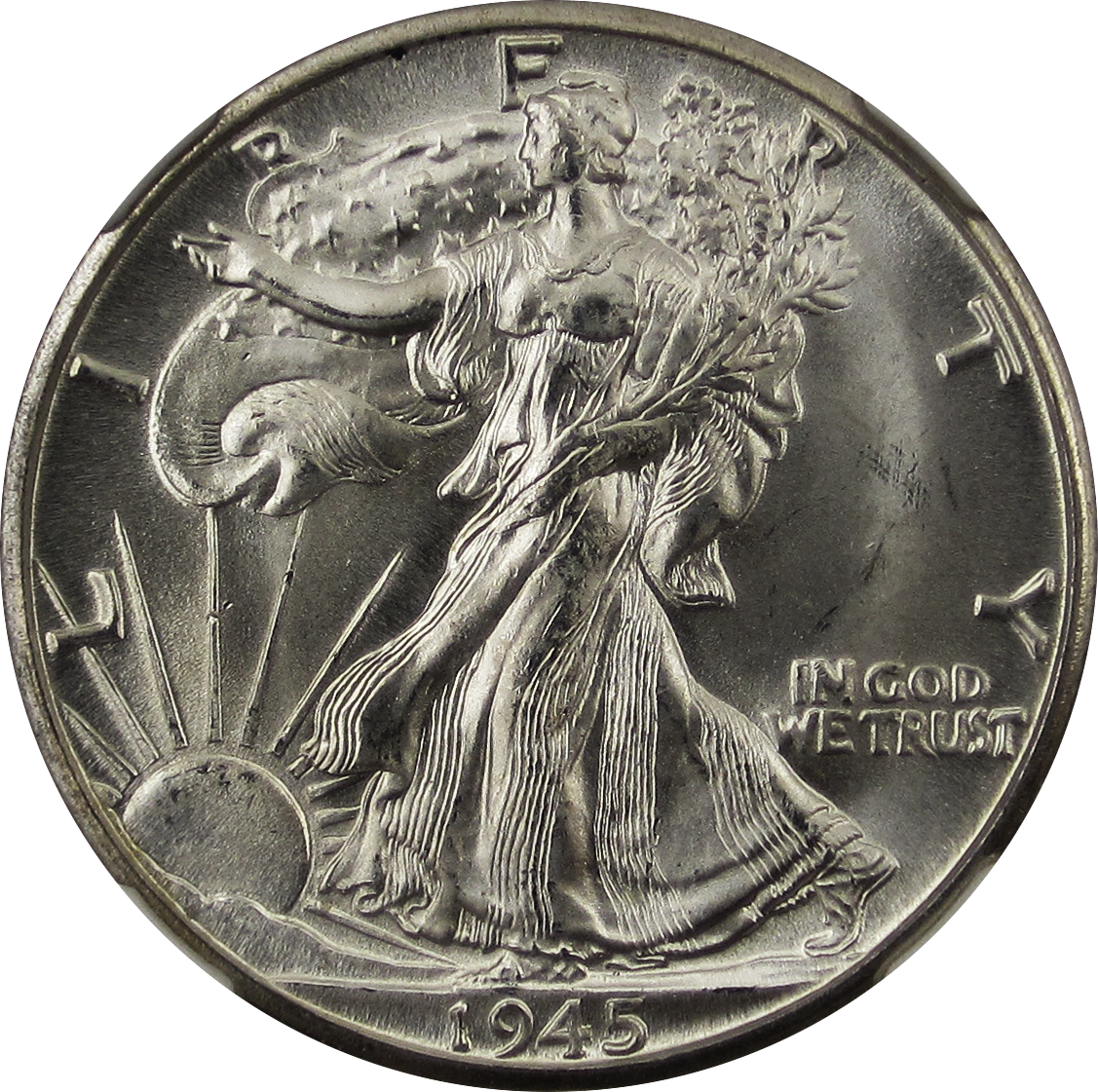
A Walking Liberty half dollar in MS (Mint State) condition, graded MS66.

Mint State refers to a coin minted for regular distribution that was never actually put into circulation, i.e., it was never used for daily commerce; it is uncirculated. Since individuals never used these coins to purchase goods or services, the coins were not handed from one person to another; they were not jumbled up with other coins in pockets or purses; and they were not repeatedly counted—and touched—by retailers and bank personnel. Consequently, uncirculated coins should not show signs of wear. (Note: Even longtime coin collectors sometimes do not understand the difference between uncirculated (mint state) and circulated coins. The key distinction is that circulated coins show signs of wear. In this regard, it may prove helpful to review the definition of wear from the Oxford English Dictionary: wear n. - "The process or condition of being worn or gradually reduced in bulk or impaired in quality by continued use, friction, attrition, exposure to atmospheric or other natural destructive agencies; loss or diminution of substance or deterioration of quality due to these causes." [example quotation:] "This Scarcity will be farther increased by the Wear of Silver Coins, which has lessened their Weights considerably.")

In modern-day United States numismatics, collectors, coin dealers, and third-party grading services grade mint state coins using a number from 60 to 70 inclusive, with 70 representing a perfect coin with no visible blemishes. Coins in the lower grade range (60-63), are usually unworn, and may suffer from weak striking, bag marks and other defects that make them less attractive to the collector. Some Mint State early coins appear to be circulated due to weak strikes, die cracks, planchet problems, or metal quality. There are a few United States coins for which no mint state specimens exist, such as the 1792 silver dime, and the 1802 Draped Bust (Heraldic Eagle reverse) silver half dime.

==== Adjectival grades for uncirculated coins ====
Coin dealers and individual coin collectors often use adjectives—with or without an accompanying Sheldon numerical grade—to describe an uncirculated coin's grade. The term Brilliant Uncirculated (often abbreviated as BU) is probably the most common—and the most ambiguous—of such adjectives. While Brilliant Uncirculated (BU) ought to refer to an uncirculated coin that retains its original mint luster, some equate BU with Uncirculated, i.e., they might refer to an MS-60 coin with little or no effulgence (brightness) as Brilliant Uncirculated. Along these lines, some numismatists argue that an unscrupulous subset of coin dealers mislead customers by using adjectival grades without defining their terms. At the same time, there appears to be at least some consensus in the numismatic community for the following definitions.

Commonly Used (but unofficial) Adjectival Grades
Adjectival Grade	Equivalent Numerical Grade
Uncirculated	MS-60, MS-61, MS-62 (Note: Sometimes coin sellers apply the term Brilliant Uncirculated to coins in the MS-60 to MS-62 range, which may or may not be accurate depending on how one defines Brilliant Uncirculated (as discussed earlier). For example, PCGS defines Brilliant Uncirculated as a "generic term applied to any coin that has not been in circulation. It often is applied to coins with little 'brilliance' left, which properly should be described as simply Uncirculated." Whereas Susan Headley states that a "... BU coin ... generally falls into the lowest MS grades [MS-60, MS-61, and MS-62] on the Sheldon scale.")
Select or Choice Uncirculated	MS-63
Choice Uncirculated	MS-63, MS-64
Gem Uncirculated	MS-65, MS-66
Superb Gem Uncirculated	MS-67, MS-68, MS-69
Perfect Uncirculated	MS-70

However, bear in mind that if a coin dealer advertises a coin as "Gem Uncirculated", it does not necessarily mean that a third-party coin grading company would assign an MS-65 or MS-66 grade to the coin. (Note: Of course, it is also true that if a coin collector owns a coin graded MS-65 by one of the leading third-party grading companies, there is a distinct possibility that if the collector removed the coin from the protective holder ('slab') and submitted the coin for grading to one of the other leading grading services--or even to the same service--the coin could come back with a different grade, e.g., MS-66 or MS-64.)

==== Numerical grades for uncirculated coins ====
#	Grade	Grade code	Description
60	Mint State 60	MS60	Unattractive, dull or washed-out, mint luster typify this coin. There may be many large detracting contact marks (bag nicks), or damage spots, but absolutely no trace of wear. There could be a heavy concentration of hairlines (minute scratches to a coin's surface), or unattractive large areas of scuff-marks. Rim nicks may be present, and eye appeal is very poor. Copper coins may be dark, dull and spotted.
61	Mint State 61	MS61	Mint luster may be diminished or noticeably impaired, and the surface has clusters of small contact marks throughout. Hairlines could be very noticeable. Scuff-marks may show as unattractive patches on large areas or major features. Small rim nicks, striking or planchet defects may show, and the quality may be noticeably poor. Eye appeal is unattractive. Copper pieces will be generally dull, dark and possibly spotted.
62	Mint State 62	MS62	Impaired or dull luster may be evident. Clusters of small marks may be present throughout with a few large marks or bag nicks in prime focal areas. Hairlines may be very noticeable. Large unattractive scuff-marks might be seen on major features. The strike, rim and planchet quality may be noticeably below average. Overall eye-appeal is generally acceptable. Copper coins will show a diminished color and tone.
63	Mint State 63	MS63	Mint luster may be slightly impaired. Numerous small contact marks, and a few scattered, heavy marks may be seen. Small hairlines are visible without magnification. Several detracting scuff marks or defects may be present throughout the design or in the fields. The general quality is average, but overall, the coin is rather attractive. Copper pieces may be darkened or dull.
64	Mint State 64	MS64	Coin has good, overall average luster and even strike for the type. Several small contact marks in groups, as well as one or two moderately heavy marks may be present. One or two small patches of hairlines may show under low, (3-4x) magnification. Noticeable, light, scuff marks or defects may be seen within the design or in the field. Attractive overall quality with a pleasing eye appeal. Copper coins may be slightly dull.
65	Mint State 65	MS65	Coin shows an attractive high quality of luster and strike for the date and originating mint. A few, small, scattered, contact marks, or two larger marks may be present, and one or two small patches of hairlines may show under (5x+) magnification. Noticeable, light, scuff marks may show on the highest points of the design features. Overall quality is above average and eye appeal is very pleasing. Copper coins have full luster with original or darkened color.
66	Mint State 66	MS66	Coin has above average quality of strike and full original mint luster, with no more than two or three minor, but noticeable, contact marks. A few very light hairlines may show under (6x+) magnification, or there may be one or two light, scuff marks showing on frosted surfaces or in the field. The eye appeal must be above average and very pleasing for the date and originating mint. Copper coins display full original or lightly toned color.
67	Mint State 67	MS67	Coin has a sharp strike with full, original luster, May have three or four very small contact marks and a single, more noticeable, but not detracting mark. On comparable coins, one or two small single hairlines may show under (6x+) magnification, or one or two partially hidden scuff marks or flaws may be present. Eye appeal is exceptional. Copper coins have lustrous original color.
68	Mint State 68	MS68	Coin has a sharp strike with full original luster, with no more than four, lightly-scattered, contact marks or flaws. No hairlines or scuff marks show. Copper coins have lustrous original color. Eye appeal is exceptional.
69	Mint State 69	MS69	Coin has a sharp strike with full original luster, with no more than two small non-detracting contact marks or flaws. No hairlines or scuff marks are visible. Eye appeal is exceptional.
70	Mint State 70	MS70	The "perfect coin", as minted. Has no trace of wear, handling, scratches or contact with other coins from a (5x) magnification. Coins in this grade are almost non-existent in older coins with very few examples known. Copper coins are bright with full original color and luster. Eye appeal is exceptional.

== Proof coins ==
Like circulated grades, proof coins are graded on the Sheldon scale from 1 to 70, and are preceded by the abbreviation ‘PF’ or ‘PR’ to distinguish them from circulation strikes. Proof coins graded 60 to 70 are mirrored to those of Uncirculated grades with the difference that the coin was not made for circulation. Proof coins with the grade of PR-63 are sometimes called "Choice Proofs". Proof coins that are below the grade of 60 and show signs of circulation or mishandling have been classified as Impaired Proofs, these are not included alongside circulated coins as they were never issued or intended for circulation in the first place. Coins in impaired proof condition include coin patterns which accidentally found their way into circulation.

#	Grade	Grade code(s)	Description
1 - 59	Impaired Proof	PR-45	Grades for impaired proofs mirror those for circulated grades.
60	Proof	PR, PR-60	Grade mirrors uncirculated grade. (See chart in above section)
63	Proof	PR-63	Grade mirrors uncirculated grade.
65	Proof	PR-65	Grade mirrors uncirculated grade.
67	Proof	PR-67	Grade mirrors uncirculated grade.
70	Proof	PR-70	Grade mirrors uncirculated grade.

== Detracting coins ==
The following table describes coins that have detracting or undesirable features. Depending on the issue, coin dealers will normally grade these coins at or below a certain numerical point. Grading services typically label these coins as "authentic" with x grade "details" (ex: "MS60 details").

Type	Grade usually given	Description
Adjustment Marks	MS66 and lower	These include mostly early coins, excess metal (such as silver and gold) was cut from overweight coins to conform to weight laws.
Planchet defects	MS65 and lower	Planchet defects such as die cracks or lamination are caused by flaws in a coin's metal before it was struck. Some "established planchet defects on early copper" may be more accepting by grading services.
Striking defects	MS64 and lower	Examples include coins that are struck off center, have porosity, color impurity, or are weakly struck. The issue or issues are dependent on severity, and the resulting grade is caused by the "reality of the market". (see entry below)
Unattractive toning	MS64 and lower	Depending on conditions. Coins that have very low eye appeal will be affected as the market value of these coins cannot warrant a higher grade.
Carbon streaks	MS64 and lower	Carbon streaks are a flaw caused by environmental conditions. Some contributing factors include coin storage in a damp place, or exposure to cigar or cigarette smoke.
Fingermarks	MS63 and lower	Oils exist in human fingerprints which can leave marks on the surface of a coin. These marks are usually the result of mishandling.
PVC damage	MS63 and lower	Improperly stored coins in vinyl 2x2 flips, older albums, and coin holders. Green and gray streaks and/or spots appear on the surface of an affected coin.
Black spots	MS63 and lower	Also known as sulfur spots, these coins are given dark brown to black spots by sulfur in the environment. These black spots have also been incorrectly dubbed as carbon spots, but carbon does not contribute to oxidation.
Slide marks (aka "rub")	MS63 and lower	Slide marks are caused by improperly placing a coin into an album that contains plastic strip slides. The marks are given as the plastic slides or rubs across the surface of a given coin.
Overdipping	MS62 and lower	These coins were dipped into a dilute acid solution too many times which stripped the coin's surface of luster.
Cleaning marks	MS62 and lower	See: Cleaning (coinage)
Corrosion spots	MS62 and lower	Copper coins can turn green, while silver coins turn black from oxidation.
Wear	AU58 and lower	By definition an uncirculated coin will show no trace of wear.
Whizzing	AU50 and lower	These coins were gone over with a metal or wire brush to "enhance" the uncirculated details. Whizzing causes damage and wear to the surface of a coin which lowers its grade to "circulated" status.
