= International Coin Certification Service =

Coin certification company

International Coin Certification Service (ICCS) is a Canadian third-party coin certification company located in Toronto, Ontario. ICCS certification consists of grading, authentication, grade qualification, variety attribution, and other determinations. ICCS grades most world coins but is particularly known for grading Canadian dollars.

ICCS encases coins in a PET film envelope that is sealed in a plastic flip. The ICCS grading certificate is sealed in the other side of the flip.

ICCS Certified coin in soft flip

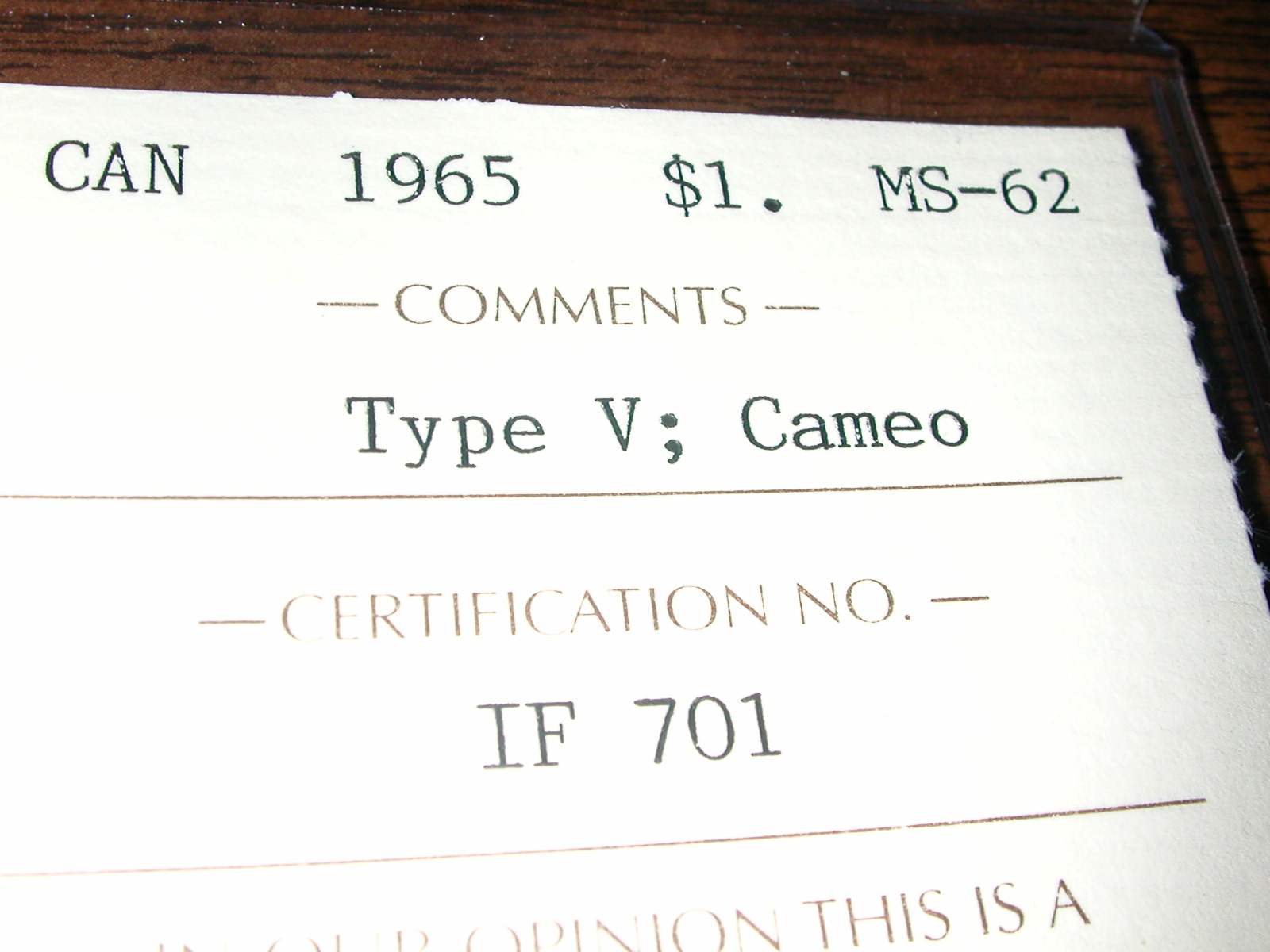
ICCS certificate
