= Professional Coin Grading Service =

American coin grading organization

Professional Coin Grading Service PCGS
- Industry: Rare coins
- Founded: California, U.S. (1985)
- Founders: David Hall, Silvano DiGenova, Bruce Amspacher, Gordon Wrubel, Van Simmons, John Danreuther, Steve Cyrkin
- Headquarters: 1610 E. St. Andrew Place, Suite 150, Santa Ana, California 92705
- Area served: Worldwide
- Products: Coin certification services and supplies, memberships and subscriptions
- Parent: Collectors Universe
- Website: www.pcgs.com

Professional Coin Grading Service (PCGS) is an American third-party coin grading, authentication, attribution, and encapsulation service founded in 1985. The intent of its seven founding dealers, including the firm's former president David Hall, was to standardize grading. The firm has divisions in Europe and Asia, and is owned by parent company Collectors Universe. PCGS has graded over 42.5 million coins, medals, and tokens valued at over $36 billion.

== History ==
PCGS was founded in 1985 by seven dealers, including the firm's former president, David Hall. The founders' intent was to establish definitive grading standards, backed by a guarantee of grading accuracy. PCGS began operations on February 3, 1986. The firm has since started grading foreign coins and established divisions in Europe and Asia, and was purchased by Collectors Universe.

== Services ==
PCGS offers certification for a wide range of U.S. and foreign coins. This process involves grading, authenticating, attributing, and encapsulating these coins in transparent, airtight plastic holders. In addition to these services, PCGS provides specialized label programs, designations like "First Strike," high-quality photography through True View, conservation services, and tiered certification options based on coin values and turnaround times. Coins that have been improperly cleaned, doctored, damaged, or exhibit other impairments would not receive a numerical grade from PCGS. However, upon request, they can still be authenticated and assigned verbal "details" grades.

== Coin holders ==
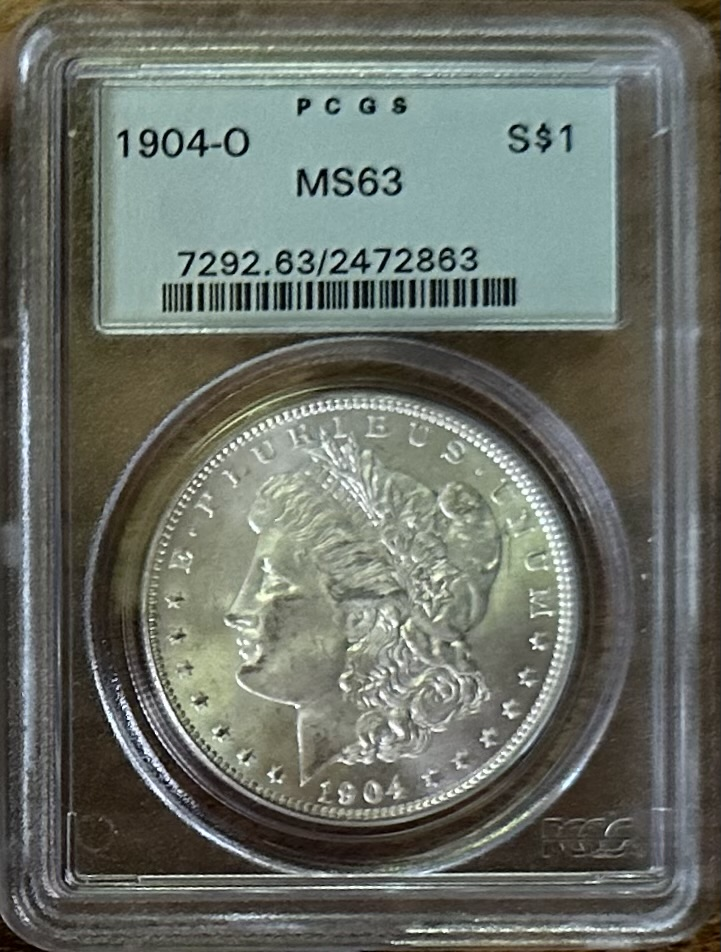
PCGS certified 1904-O MS 63 in a coin slab

The PCGS holder, or a Coin slab which is made of clear, inert plastic and is stackable. Anti-counterfeiting measures include a hologram on the back, markings within the holder, and Near Field Communication (NFC) chip embedded in some holders. Printed on the front of the blue paper insert is the coin's type, denomination, grade, attribution, pedigree (if any), serial number, Universal Product Code (UPC), and other pertinent information. First-generation PCGS coin holders are smaller and lack the raised stackable edges of later issues. Their insert was printed on plain white paper. In some of these early holders, the coin will be loose enough to produce noise when the holder is handled, thus their "rattler" nickname.

PCGS was at one point named the official grading service of the Professional Numismatic Guild; during that time, the PNG logo was included on the holder. This design was replaced with a different one when PNG switched their affiliation to NGC.

== Population report ==
PCGS keeps a comprehensive record, known as a census, of all the coins they have graded since their establishment. This census provides details about the grades, varieties, and specific designations assigned to each coin issue. For instance, designations like "prooflike" for Morgan dollars or "full bands" for Mercury dimes are included. This report is accessible at no cost and is updated daily on their website. While this information used to be available in a printed version released monthly, that hardcopy version has been discontinued.

Through an analysis of the population reports provided by both PCGS and NGC, estimations of coin rarity have been facilitated. By examining these databases over time, certain coins previously believed to be rare have turned out to be surprisingly common, while others assumed to be common have revealed themselves to be more scarce than initially thought.

Numismatic professionals closely follow these population reports because they understand that the reported numbers can be affected by practices such as multiple submissions of the same coins. This involves removing coins from their holders and resubmitting them in the hope of achieving a higher grade. Consequently, population figures might be artificially inflated. Conversely, there can be instances where population figures appear lower than expected due to the hesitancy to submit less valuable coins for grading, especially when the cost of the service exceeds the coin's value.

== PCGS CoinFacts ==
PCGS maintains CoinFacts, the "single source of information on U.S. coins." The free site publishes information about all federal and most non-federal U.S. coin issues, including their rarity statistics, PCGS Price Guide values, population data, public auction performances, die varieties, and photographs.

== Price guide ==
PCGS offers a complimentary, partially accessible online compilation of U.S. and foreign coin values. These values pertain exclusively to coins that have received PCGS certification. The data for these values is sourced from various channels, including dealer advertisements and price lists, realized auction prices, and transactions that occur during trade shows.

== PCGS Set Registry ==
In 2001, PCGS established its free Set Registry program, which includes an online leader board that allowed collectors to compete against one another in thousands of potential sets composed of PCGS-graded coins. It hosts more than 113,000 sets. Each coin in a set is given a value computed by its relative scarcity. A version of the Registry is also maintained by PCGS' main competitor, NGC.

== Dealer survey ==
Dealers surveyed by the trade associations the Professional Numismatists Guild (PNG) and the Industry Council For Tangible Assets (ICTA) gave a "Superior" rating for PCGS, the highest given for any service. Of the other 10 grading services evaluated in the survey, only the Numismatic Guaranty Corporation (NGC) also received the "Superior" rating. Survey respondents were asked for their professional opinions to evaluate 11 grading services based on 12 different weighted criteria, such as grading and authentication accuracy. Each category was ranked by the respondents on a 10-point scale ranging from the lowest, "Unacceptable", to the highest, "Outstanding".

== Controversies ==
In 1990 the Federal Trade Commission filed a civil action against PCGS alleging exaggerated advertising claims. A settlement was reached in which PCGS did not admit wrongdoing but agreed to submit its advertising for review for five years, and include a disclaimer in its ads.

== See also ==
- Coin collecting
- Currency
- First Strike Coins
