= Coin grading =

Process of determining a collectible coin's visual state

Coin grading is the process of determining the grade or condition of a coin, one of the key factors in determining its collectible value. Several grading systems have been developed. Certification services professionally grade coins for tiered fees. The grading scale ranges from 1-70.

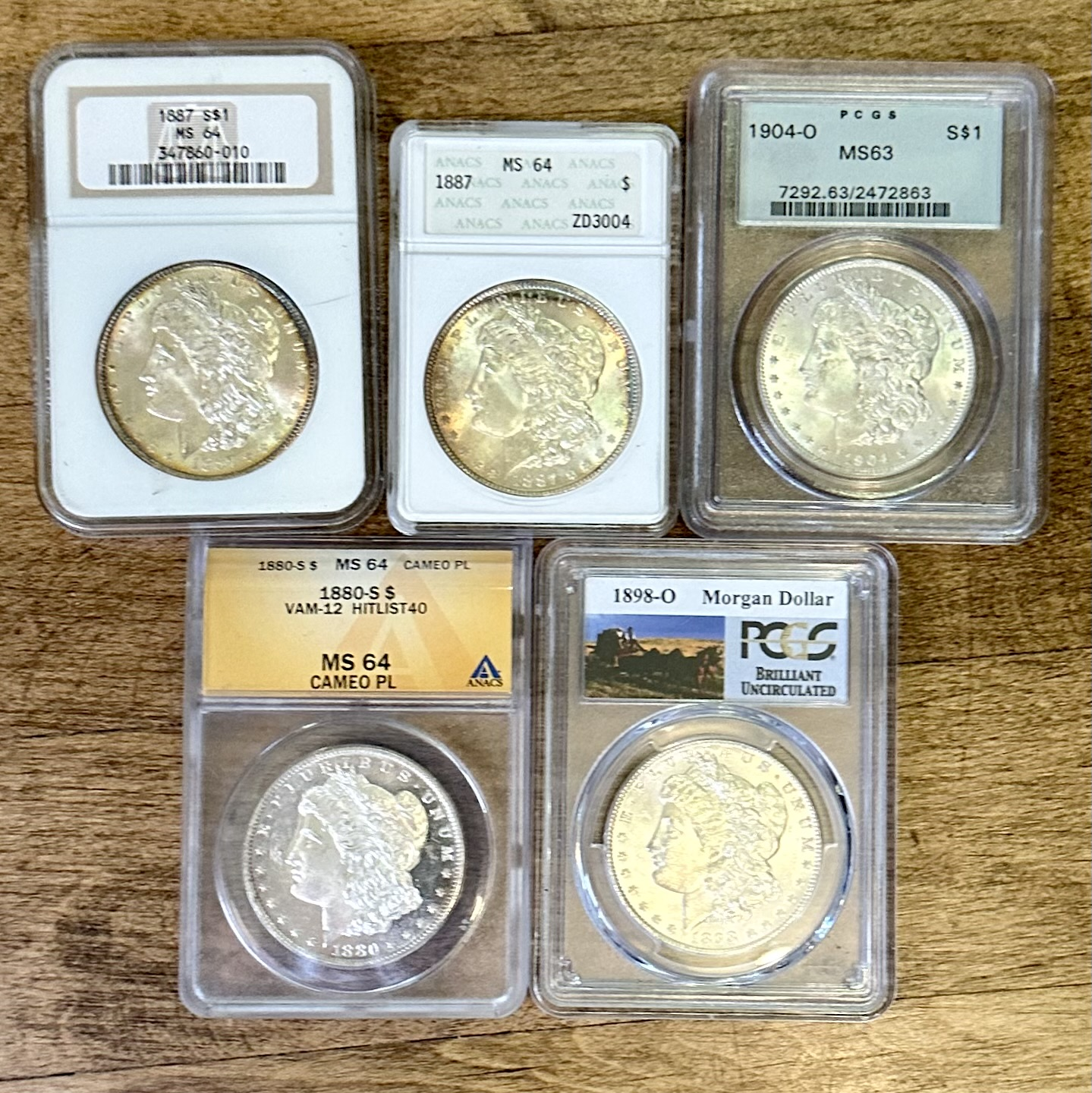
Graded and slabbed Morgan dollars within a variety of coin slabs. Top row from left: NGC, ANACS, PCGS, bottom row from left: ANACS, PCGS

== Overview ==
A "grade" measures a coin's appearance. There are generally five main components which determine a coin's grade: strike, surface preservation, luster, coloration, attractiveness, and occasionally the country/state in which it was minted. Grading is subjective and even experts can disagree about the grade of a given coin.

=== History ===
U.S. coin grading has evolved over the years to a system of finer and finer grade distinctions. Originally, there were only two grades, new and used. This changed to the letter grading system beginning with the lowest grade – Basal State (also Poor (PO)), then continuing Fair (Fr), About or Almost Good (AG), Good (G), Very Good (VG), Fine (F), Very Fine (VF), Extremely Fine (EF), Almost or About Uncirculated (AU), Uncirculated (Unc) and up to Brilliant Uncirculated (BU). Gem Uncirculated was roughly equivalent in usage to BU at that time. Numerical grades from 1 to 70 now accompany the verbal grades.

== Systems ==
=== Early grading systems ===
The quality of all coins is not equal and collectors felt the necessity of defining the quality of the coins in order to assess their value. Rim damage, nicks, polishing, cleaning, scratches and other forms of wear are considered factors in grading a coin. Whether or not a coin shows evidence of having been mounted in jewelry also affects its grade.

In the early years of coin collecting, three general terms were used to grade coins:

- good - when circulation had worn the surface of the coin, but major details were still visible.
- fine - when features were less worn and a bit of mint luster showed on the surface. Most major and minor detail visible
- uncirculated - when the features of the coin were sharp and the luster approaching the state of a new coin at the mint.

=== Sheldon grading system ===
As the collector market for coins grew rapidly in the late 19th and early 20th centuries, it became apparent that a more precise grading standard was needed. Some coins were simply more fine than others, and some uncirculated coins showed more luster and far fewer marks than others. Terms like "gem uncirculated" and "very fine" began to see use, as more precise grading descriptions allowed for more precise pricing for the booming collector market.

In 1948, well-known numismatist William Herbert Sheldon attempted to standardize coin grading by proposing what is now known as the Sheldon Scale, as is detailed below. Sheldon's 1 to 70 grading scale, included in his book Penny Whimsy, was originally devised for U.S. large cents but it is now applied to all series.

=== European grading system ===
European countries use various, roughly equivalent, grading systems. The main features of their systems are presented in the following table:

European Grading System
| US and Canada | Design remaining | United Kingdom | France | Spain | Italy | Germany | Scandinavia | Netherlands | Portugal |
|---|---|---|---|---|---|---|---|---|---|
| Good (G-4 or G-6) | 10% | G | AB (Assez Beau) | RC | M | GE (Gut erhalten) | 2 | G (Goed) | REG |
| Very Good (VG-8 or VG-10) | 25% | VG | B (Beau) | BC | B (Bello) | SGE (Sehr gut erhalten) | 1- | ZG (Zeer Goed) | MREG |
| Fine (F-12 or F-15) | 50% | F | TB (Très Beau) | BC+ | MB (Molto Bello) | S (Schön) | 1 | Fr (Fraai) | BC |
| Very Fine (VF-20 to VF-35) | 75% | VF | TTB (Très Très Beau) | MBC | BB (Bellissimo) | SS (Sehr schön) | 1+ | ZF (Zeer Fraai) | MBC |
| Extremely Fine (XF-40 or XF-45) | 90% | EF/XF | SUP (Superbe) | MBC+ / EBC- | SPL (Splendido) | VZ (Vorzüglich) | 01 | Pr. (Prachtig) | MBC+ / Bela- |
| About Uncirculated (AU-50 to AU-58) | 95% + some luster | UNC | No use | EBC / EBC+ | MSPL (Molto Splendido) | UNZ− (Fast unzirkuliert) | 0-01 | No use | Bela / Bela+ |
| Mint State (MS-60 to MS-64) | 100% + luster | BU | SPL (Splendide) | SC | SPL/FDC | UNZ (Unzirkuliert) | 0 | FDC (Fleur de Coin) | Soberba |
| Mint State (MS-65 to MS-70) | 100% + full luster | FDC | FDC (Fleur de Coin) | FDC | FDC (Fior di Conio) | STGL (Stempelglanz) | 0 | FDC | FDC (Flor de Cunho) |

== American Numismatic Association scale ==
As the hobby of numismatics evolved, the need arose for a more concrete grading system. In 1978, the American Numismatic Association published the Official A.N.A. Grading System for United States Coins. It established grading tiers of, in descending order of preservation, Mint State, About Uncirculated, Extremely Fine, Very Fine, Fine, Very Good, Good and About Good. Most numismatists, as well as third-party grading services, also use two other descriptors for the lowest grades, Fair and Poor. The higher tiers on this scale each encompass two or more "sub-grades" denoted by the appending of the corresponding Sheldon scale number, such as Very Fine-20 or Very Fine-30. This allows for the recognition of coins which exceed the standard for a given tier, but do not meet the criteria for the next. Grades are commonly abbreviated, and not all numismatists use the numerical grades, so a grade of Fine-12 may be rendered as Fine, F-12, 12 or simply F.

== Certification services ==
Coin certification services emerged in the 1980s as a response to the need for buyers and sellers to agree on grading. For tiered fees, certification services grade, authenticate, attribute, and encapsulate coins in clear, plastic holders. Professional Coin Grading service (PCGS), Numismatic Guaranty Corporation (NGC), Independent Coin Graders (ICG), and American Numismatic Association Certification Service (ANACS) are the most popular services. These are the only services whose coins have a special section on eBay, the largest rare coin marketplace. All four firms guarantee the grades and authenticity of their certified coins. Together they have certified over 80 million coins.

At each of the four main grading companies, a similar process is used. Each coin is graded (on a verbal and 1 to 70 numerical scale) and authenticated by two or more graders, and then assigned a final grade by a finalizer, based in part upon the recommendations of the prior graders. Depending on the company, various descriptors may be added, such as Full Bands for Mercury dimes, Full Bell Lines (FBL) for Franklin Half Dollars, or Deep Mirror Prooflike (DMPL) for Morgan dollars, and the coin's die variety may be noted. The coin is then slabbed and returned to the customer. In 2010, PCGS and NGC introduced "Plus" grading for high-end coins graded XF45 to MS68. A plus symbol (+) is added after the grade.

In 2007, the Professional Numismatists Guild (PNG), a US association of rare coin dealers, released the results of a survey of major coin dealers who gave their professional opinions about 11 certification services. PCGS and NGC were rated "Superior" overall, with ANACS and ICG deemed "Good". PCI and SEGS were listed as "Poor", while called "Unacceptable" were Accugrade (ACG), Numistrust Corporation (NTC), Hallmark Coin Grading Service (HCGS), American Coin Club Grading Service (ACCGS), and Star Grading Services (SGS).

Counterfeit NGC and PCGS holders have been reported, but significant measures have been taken by both services to remedy the problem, such as NGC's use of photographic verification for every coin certified and both services' employment of serial number verification and anti-counterfeiting features in their holders.

== See also ==
- Cameo (coinage)
- Coin cleaning
- Coin collecting
- Exonumia
- Paper currency grading
- Proof coinage
- Troy weight
