= RCW =

RCW may refer to

- Rare Coin Wholesalers
- Ramial Chipped Wood
- Runtime Callable Wrapper in Microsoft Component Object Model and .NET interoperability
- Revolutionary Championship Wrestling, a professional wrestling promotion
- RCW Catalogue, an astronomical catalogue
- Revised Code of Washington, laws and statutes effective in the jurisdiction of Washington state
- Return to Castle Wolfenstein, a video game originally published in 2001
- Red cockaded woodpecker, an endangered woodpecker native to the southeastern United States.
- Riot City Wrestling, a professional wrestling promotion
- Russian Civil War, a civil war that took place between 1918–20 following the 1917 Russian Revolution
- Rwandan Civil War, a conflict in Rwanda between 1990–1994
