= Dollar coin (United States) =

Denomination of United States currency

Sacagawea has been featured on the obverse of U.S. dollar coins since 2000.

The dollar coin is a United States coin with a face value of one dollar. Dollar coins have been minted in the U.S. in silver, gold, and base metal versions. Dollar coins have almost never been popular in circulation since their inception. Despite efforts by the U.S. government to promote their use to save the cost of printing one-dollar bills, modern coins are seldom seen in circulation, since most Americans prefer to use paper bills.

Dollar coins were first minted in 1794 and were struck in 90% silver; these variants are commonly called a silver dollar. The Morgan dollar and Peace dollar were the most widely produced silver dollar series of the 19th and 20th centuries. Gold dollars were also produced from 1849 to 1889. Modern dollar coins are composed of clad metals, including the Eisenhower dollar and Susan B. Anthony dollar; the latter was the first circulating U.S. coin to depict a historical woman. Introduced in 2000, the Sacagawea dollar established the golden-colored manganese-brass composition used for subsequent issues. Other modern series include Presidential dollars, which honored former U.S. presidents, and American Innovation dollars, which highlight innovations from each U.S. state.

Due to their unpopularity, the United States Mint has not produced dollar coins for general circulation since 2011, and all dollar coins produced after that date have been specifically for collectors. These collector coins can be ordered directly from the Mint, while pre-2012 circulation dollars can be obtained from most U.S. banks.

== History ==
The original dollar traces back to a silver coin called "Joachimsthaler", originating in 1520 in the mining town of Joachimsthal, today known as Jáchymov in the Czech Republic. That coin's name was shortened to "thaler", which became "daler" in Dutch. Dutch "dalers" circulated in New Amsterdam and the English colonies, where English speakers started calling such coins "dollars".

Before the American Revolutionary War, coins from many European nations circulated freely in the American colonies, as did coinage issued by the various colonies. Chief among these were the Spanish silver dollar coins, also called pieces of eight or eight reales, minted in Mexico and other colonies with silver mined from North, Central and South American mines. These coins, along with others of similar size and value, were in use throughout the colonies, and later the United States, and were legal tender until 1857.

In 1776, several thousand pewter Continental Currency coins were minted. Although unconfirmed, many numismatists believe these to have been pattern coins of a proposed silver dollar coin authorized by the Continental Congress to prop up the rapidly failing Continental Currency—the first attempt by the fledgling U.S. at paper currency. Several examples were also struck in brass and silver, but a circulating coin was not produced, in large part because of the financial difficulties of running the Revolutionary War. The Continental Currency dollar coin bears the date 1776, and while its true denomination is not known, it is generally the size of later dollars, and the name has stuck. The failure of the Continental Currency exacerbated a distrust of paper money among both politicians and the population at large. The letters of Thomas Jefferson indicate that he wished the United States to eschew paper money and instead mint coins of similar perceived value and worth to those foreign coins circulating at the time.

== Silver dollar coins ==
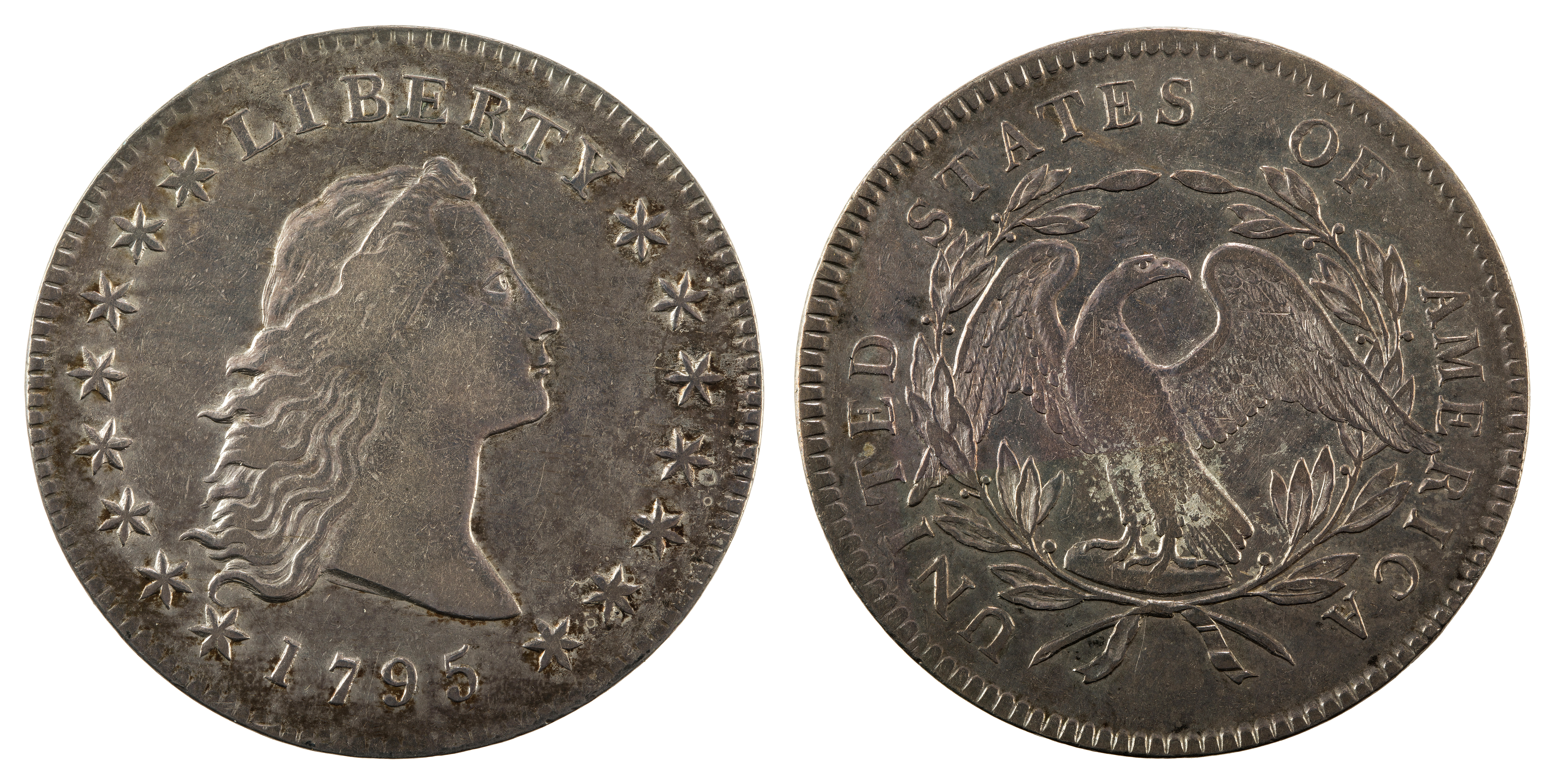
1795 Flowing Hair dollar

The Coinage Act of 1792 authorized the production of dollar coins from silver. The United States Mint produced silver dollar coins from 1794 to 1803, then ceased regular production of silver dollars until 1836. The first silver dollars, precisely 1,758 of them, were coined on October 15, 1794, and were immediately delivered to Mint Director David Rittenhouse for distribution to dignitaries as souvenirs.

Thereafter, until 1804, they were struck in varying quantities. There are two obverse designs: Flowing Hair (1794–1795) and Draped Bust (1795–1804). There are also two reverse designs used for the Draped Bust variety: small eagle (1795–1798) and heraldic eagle (1798–1804). Original silver dollars from this period are highly prized by coin collectors and are exceptionally valuable, and range from fairly common to incredibly rare. Because of the early practice of hand engraving each die, there are dozens of varieties known for all dates between 1795 and 1803.

It is also one of only two denominations (the other being the cent) minted every year from its inception during the first decade of mint operation. Though a new Spanish dollar or 8-real minted after 1772 theoretically contained 417.7 grains of silver of fineness 130/144 (or 377.1 grains fine silver), reliable assays of the period confirmed a fine silver content of 370.95 grains (24.037 g) for the average Spanish dollar in circulation.

The new US silver dollar of 371.25 grains (24.057 g) therefore compared favorably and was received at par with the Spanish dollar for foreign payments. In 1803, President Thomas Jefferson halted new silver dollars made out of the US Mint's limited resources since it failed to stay in domestic circulation. The less-exportable half dollar therefore became the largest US-made silver coin in domestic use for the next several decades. It was only after Mexican independence in 1821 when their peso's fine silver content of 377.1 grains was firmly upheld, which the US later had to compete with using a heavier Trade dollar coin of 378.0 grains (24.49 g) fine silver.

=== 1804 dollar ===
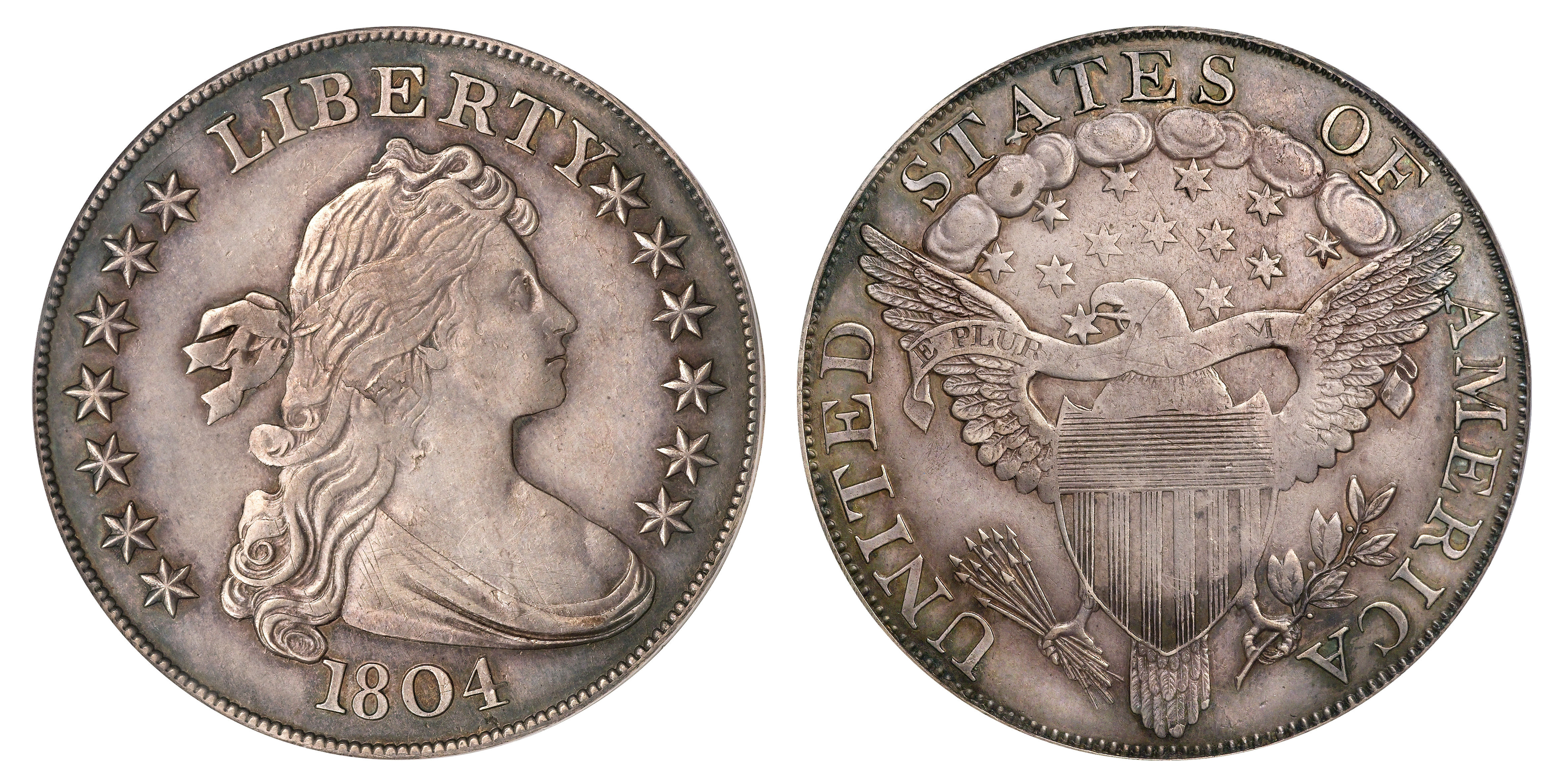
1804 silver dollar

The 1804 dollar is one of the rarest and most famous coins in the world. Its creation was the result of a simple bookkeeping error, but its status as a highly prized rarity has been established for nearly a century and a half. Only 16 silver dollars with the date of 1804 are known to exist; in 1999, one of them sold at auction for more than $4 million.

=== Seated Liberty dollar (1836–1873) ===
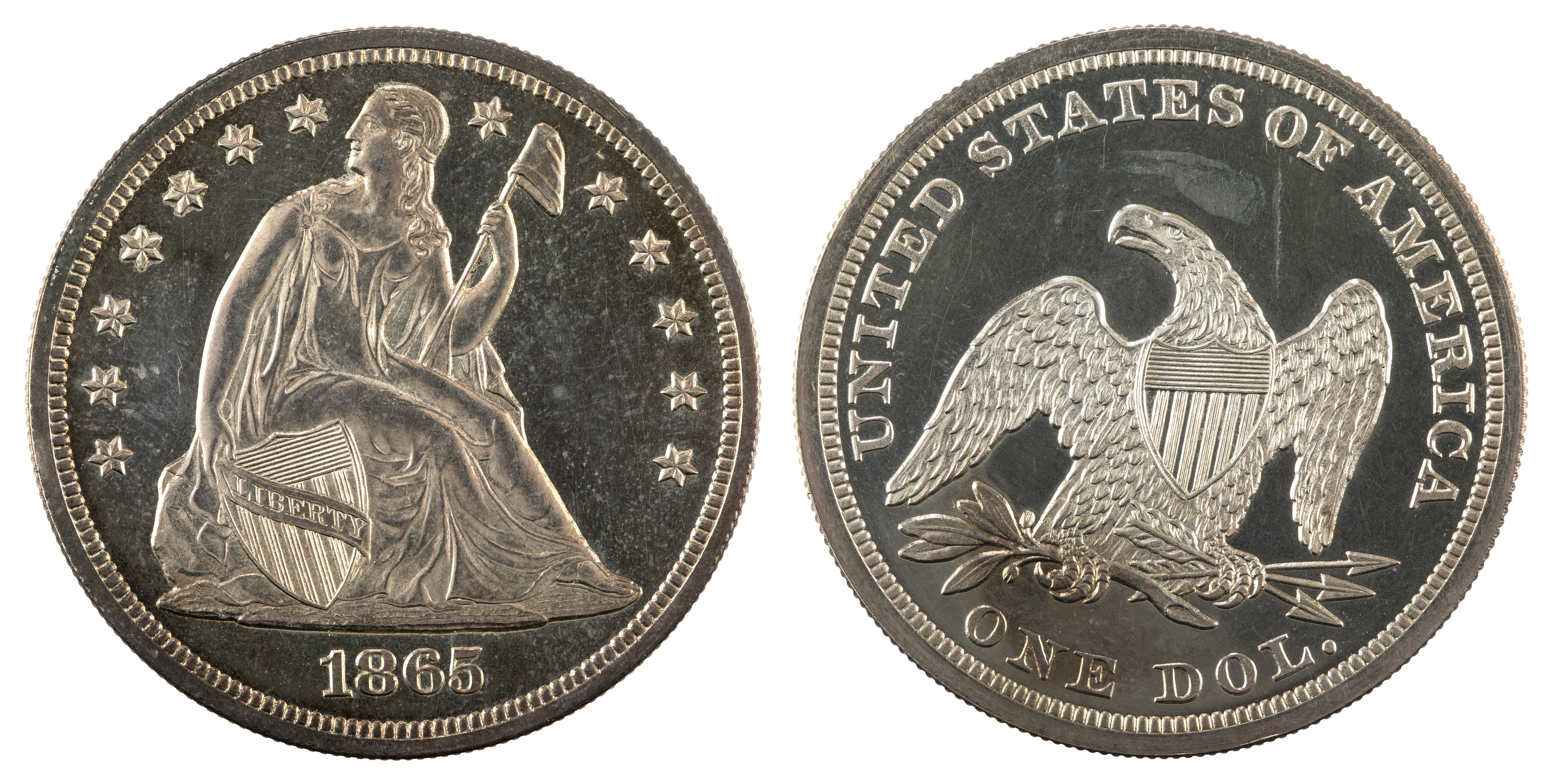
1865 Seated Liberty dollar

Seated Liberty dollars were introduced in 1836 and were minted in lesser quantities than the sparsely minted Gobrecht dollar that preceded it. The dollars were used in general circulation until 1873. Each Seated Liberty dollar is composed of 0.77344 troy oz of silver. They were minted at Philadelphia, New Orleans, Carson City, and San Francisco. A silver dollar would be worth $1 in silver if the price of silver is $1.29 per troy ounce. The current silver price (January 29, 2021) is $27.03 per troy ounce so a silver dollar is worth, in melt value of about US$20.90.

The production of large numbers of U.S. gold coins from new California mines lowered the price of gold, thereby increasing the value of silver. By 1853, the value of a U.S. silver dollar contained in gold terms, $1.04 of silver, equal to $40.25 today. With the Mint Act of 1853, all U.S. silver coins, except for the U.S. silver dollar and new 3-cent coin, were reduced by 6.9% as of weight with arrows on the date to denote reduction. The U.S. silver dollar continued to be minted in very small numbers mainly as a foreign trade coin with the Orient.

The international trading partners did not like the fact that U.S. coins were reduced in weight. The use of much more common half dollars became problematic since merchants would have to separate higher value pre-1853 coins from the newer reduced ones. From 1853 onward, trade with Asia was typically done with Mexican coins that kept their weight and purity in the 19th century. This ended in 1874 when the price of silver dropped so that a silver dollar had less than $1.00 worth of silver in it (because of huge amounts of silver coming from the Nevada Comstock Lode mines). By 1876, all silver coins were being used as money and by 1878, gold was at par with all U.S. paper dollars.

=== Trade dollar (1873–1885) ===
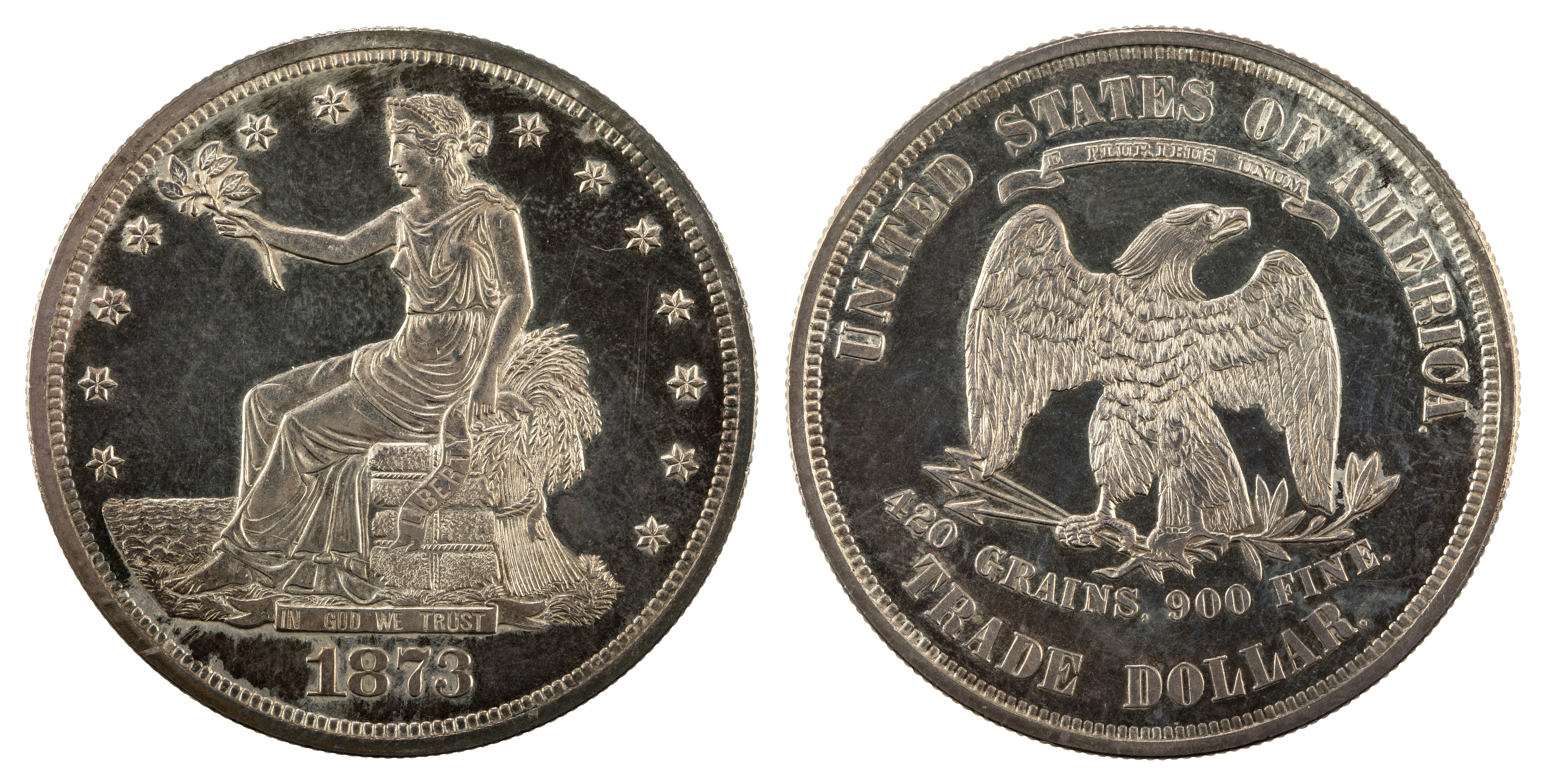
1873 Trade dollar

The trade dollar was produced in response to other Western powers, such as Great Britain, Spain, France, and particularly Mexico, to compete with these trade coins for use in trade in Asia. While the previous Spanish dollar of 370.95 grains (24.037 g) contained less fine silver than the standard dollar coin of 371.25 grains (24.057 g), Mexican pesos minted after Mexican independence contained a full 377.1 grains (24.44 g) of fine silver.

The American trade dollar therefore had to contain more silver, at 420 grains of 90% fine silver, fine content 378.0 grains (24.49 g), or 0.44 g more fine silver than the regular circulation silver dollars. Most trade dollars ended up in China during their first two years of production, where they were very successful. Many of them exhibit holes or chopmarks which are counterstamps from Asian merchants to verify the authenticity of the coins.

Trade dollars did not circulate in the United States initially, but were legal tender for up to $5. Production of the trade dollar was officially discontinued for business strikes in 1878, and thereafter from 1879 to 1885, produced only as proof examples of the coin. The issues of 1884 and 1885 were produced surreptitiously and were unknown to the collecting public until 1908. In February 1887, all non-mutilated, non-chopmarked outstanding trade dollars were made redeemable to the United States Treasury for $1, and approximately 8 million of them were turned in.

=== Morgan dollar (1878–1904, 1921, 2021–present) ===
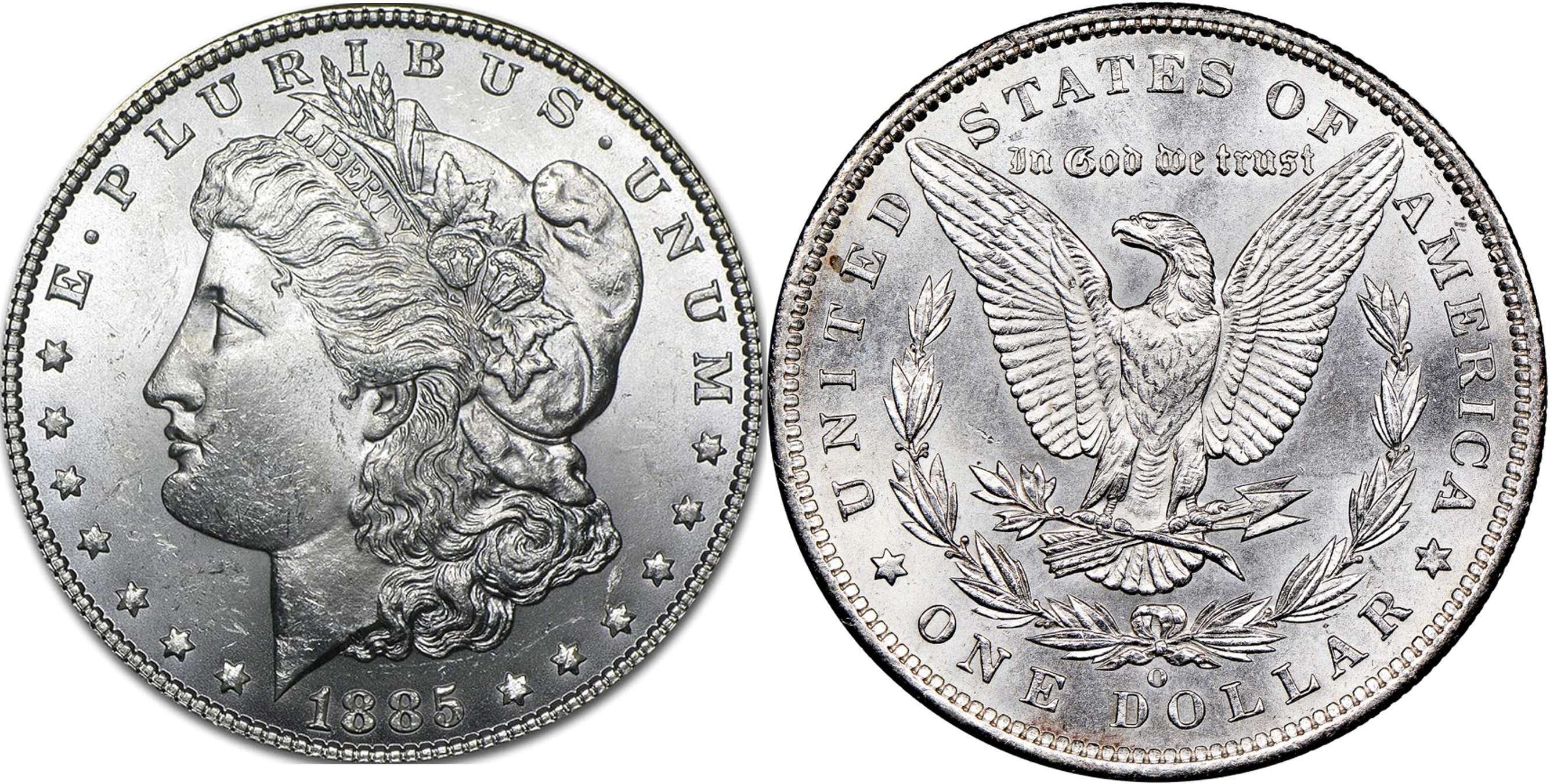
1885 Morgan dollar

Morgan silver dollars, all composed of 90% silver and 10% copper (slightly less silver than sterling silver, 92.5%) weighing 412.5 grains total (0.859375 ozt), and thus 0.7734375 ozt pure silver, (Note: see Bland–Allison Act) (Note: see Coinage Act of 1834) were struck between 1878 and 1904, with a minting in 1921 and a commemorative minting in 2021. The 1921-dated coins are the most common, and there exists a substantial collector market for pristine, uncirculated specimens of the rarer dates and mint marks.

Morgan dollars are second only to Lincoln Cents in collector popularity. The coin is named after George T. Morgan, its designer. Morgan dollars were minted at Philadelphia (no mint mark), New Orleans ("O" mint mark), San Francisco ("S" mint mark), Carson City ("CC" mint mark), and (in 1921 only) Denver ("D" mint mark). The mint mark is found on the reverse below the wreath, above the "O" in "DOLLAR". Production of the Morgan Dollar began again in 2021 as collectors' items and US Mint officials announced an intention to continue producing them in 2023 and beyond.

=== Peace dollar (1921–1928, 1934–1935, 2021–present) ===
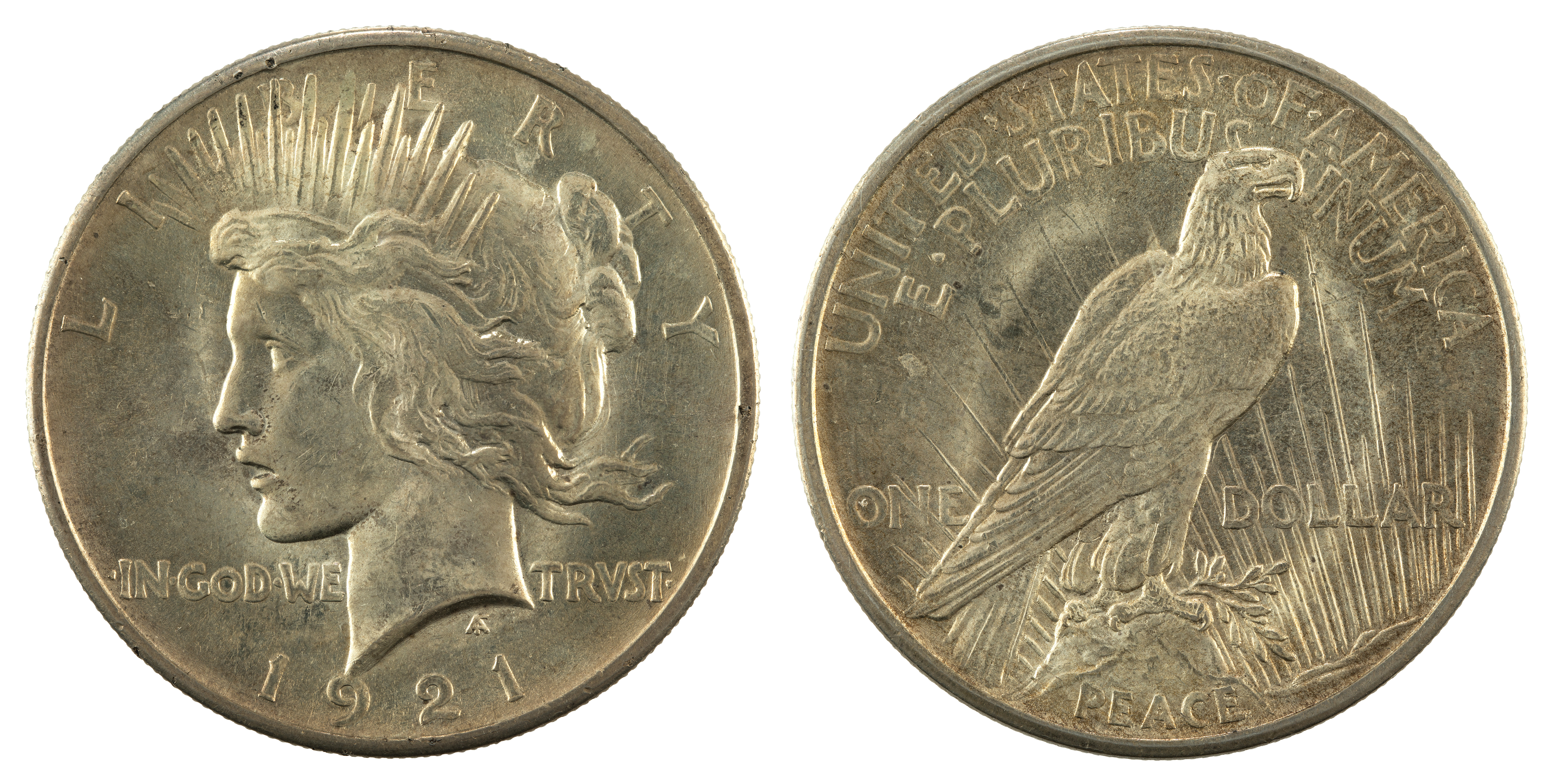
1921 Peace dollar

Introduced in December 1921 and having the same ratio of silver-to-copper as the Morgan dollar, the Peace dollar, designed by medalist Anthony de Francisci, was promulgated to commemorate the signing of formal peace treaties between the Allied forces and Germany and Austria. These treaties officially ended the Allies' World War I hostilities with these two countries. In 1922 the Mint made silver dollar production its top priority, causing other denominations to be produced sparingly if at all that year. Production ceased temporarily after 1928. Original plans called for only a one-year suspension, but this was extended by the Great Depression. Mintage resumed in 1934, but for only two years.

In May 1965, 316,000+ Peace dollars were minted, all at the Denver Mint and dated 1964-D. Plans for completing this coinage were abandoned, and most of those already minted were melted, with two known trial strike specimens being preserved for assay purposes until 1970, when they too were melted, and none released either for circulation or collection purposes.

It is rumored that one or more pieces still exist, most notably any examples obtained by key members of Congress, the president, or mint officials. However, this coin, much like the 1933 $20 gold double eagle, aside from the "exception", sold in 2002 for over $7 million and the 10 found later, is illegal to own and would be subject to confiscation.

Minting of the Peace Dollar began again in 2021 for collectors. US Mint officials have announced an intention to continue minting Peace Dollars in 2023 and beyond.

=== GSA dollars ===
Silver dollar coins saw limited circulation throughout their history due to their size and weight, though they remained popular as Christmas gifts, leading the Treasury to release bags of them to banks annually from the 1930s to the early 1960s. In November 1962, collectors discovered rare and valuable dates hidden among the millions of coins still in Treasury vaults, sparking a buying frenzy.

When Treasury Secretary C. Douglas Dillon announced in 1964 that silver certificates could no longer be redeemed for silver dollars, the Treasury inventoried its remaining stock and found roughly 3 million coins, many from the Carson City mint. The General Services Administration (GSA) was authorized to sell them through mail-bid sales in 1973–74, but public response was poor, with many objecting to the government profiting from coins it had minted for little more than a dollar each, leaving over a million coins unsold.

The remaining coins sat until 1979–80, when they were sold amid the chaos of Silver Thursday and the Hunt brothers' attempt to corner the silver market. The GSA repeatedly changed its rules mid-sale by invalidating minimum bids and slashing per-bidder limits from 500 coins to 35, leaving many bidders empty-handed and prompting a fresh wave of complaints to Congress. By the time the confusion cleared, the last silver dollars in Treasury hands were gone. Today, GSA dollars still in their original hard plastic holders carry a small premium, and some third-party grading services have begun certifying coins without removing them from those holders, though the practice remains controversial.

=== American Silver Eagle bullion coin (1986–present) ===
The American Silver Eagle is the official silver bullion coin of the United States. It was designed by Adolph A. Weinman and John Mercanti and it was first released by the United States Mint on November 24, 1986. It is struck only in the one troy ounce size, which has a nominal face value of one dollar and is guaranteed to contain one troy ounce of 99.9% pure silver. It is authorized by Title II of Public Law 99-61 (Liberty Coin Act, approved July 9, 1985) and codified as 31 U.S.C. § 5112(e)-(h).

Its content, weight, and purity are certified by the United States Mint. In addition to the bullion version, the United States Mint has produced a proof version and an uncirculated version for coin collectors. The Silver Eagle has been produced at the Philadelphia Mint, San Francisco Mint, and West Point Mint. The American Silver Eagle bullion coin may be used to fund Individual Retirement Account investments.

== Gold dollar coins ==
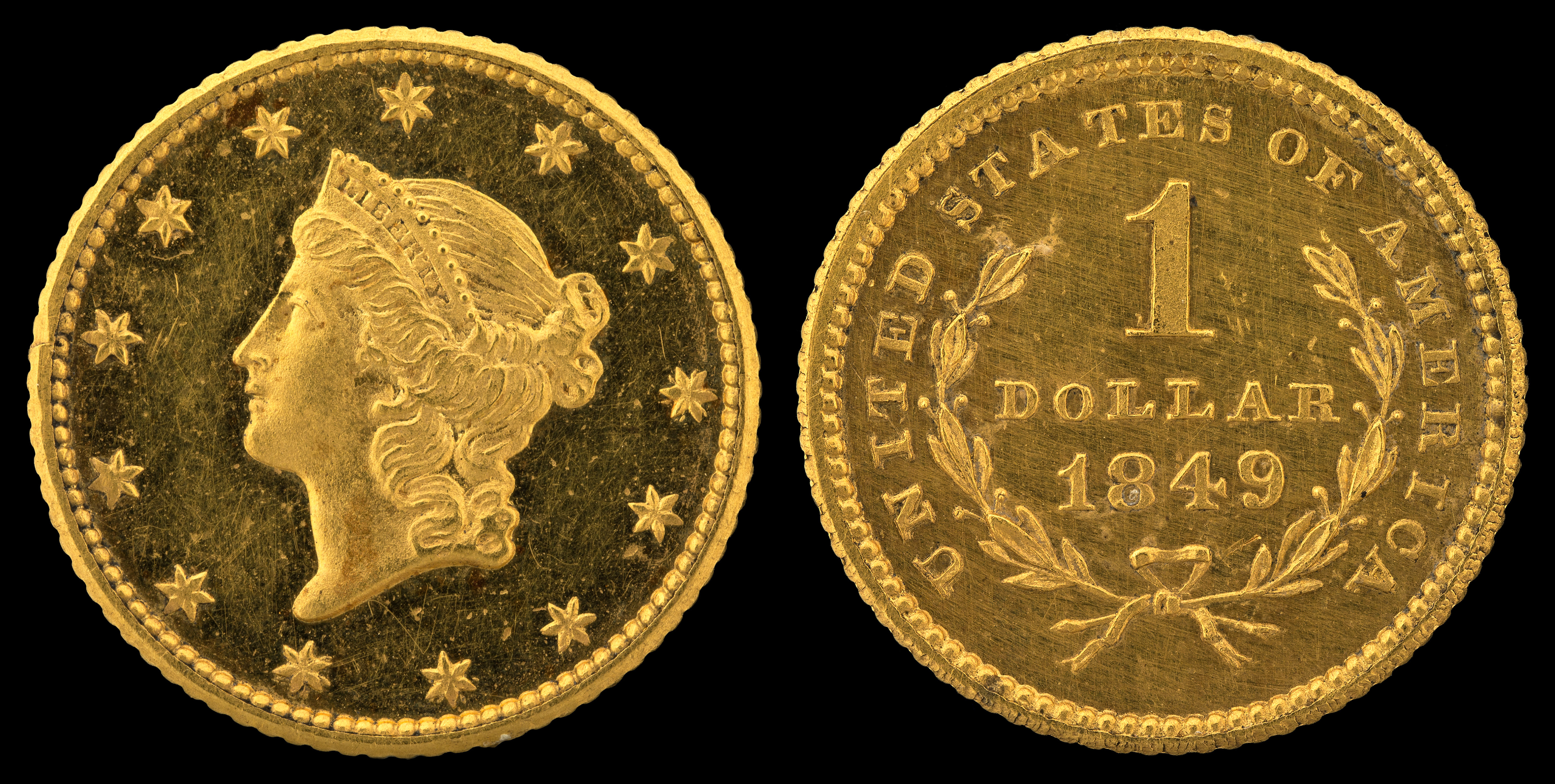
1849 Gold dollar ("Type I")

The one-dollar gold coin was struck as a regular issue from 1849 to 1889. Composed of 90% pure gold, it was the smallest denomination of gold currency ever produced by the United States federal government. When the U.S. system of coinage was originally designed there had been no plans for a gold dollar coin, but in the late 1840s, two gold rushes later, Congress was looking to expand the use of gold in the country's currency.

The coin had three types over its lifetime, all designed by Mint Chief Engraver James B. Longacre. 1849 to 1853 gold dollar coins were 13 mm across and are called Type I. Type II gold dollars were thinner but larger at 15 mm diameter and were produced from 1854 to 1855. The most common gold dollar is the Type III, struck from 1856 until 1889. In its early years, the gold dollar was commonly used due to silver hoarding, but once silver was commonly circulated again in the 1850s, the gold dollar became a rarity.

In its final years, gold dollars were struck in small numbers. It was also in demand to be mounted in jewelry, but most gold coins produced from 1863 and onward were struck for export to pay for war material and interest on U.S. government bonds. Many of these coins from the Civil War and after are in excellent condition since they saw very limited circulation with greenbacks and postage currency taking their place. While true gold dollars are no longer minted, the modern clad Sacagawea, Presidential, and American Innovation dollars are sometimes referred to as "golden dollars" because of their color.

== Modern base metal coins ==
=== Eisenhower dollar (1971–1978) ===
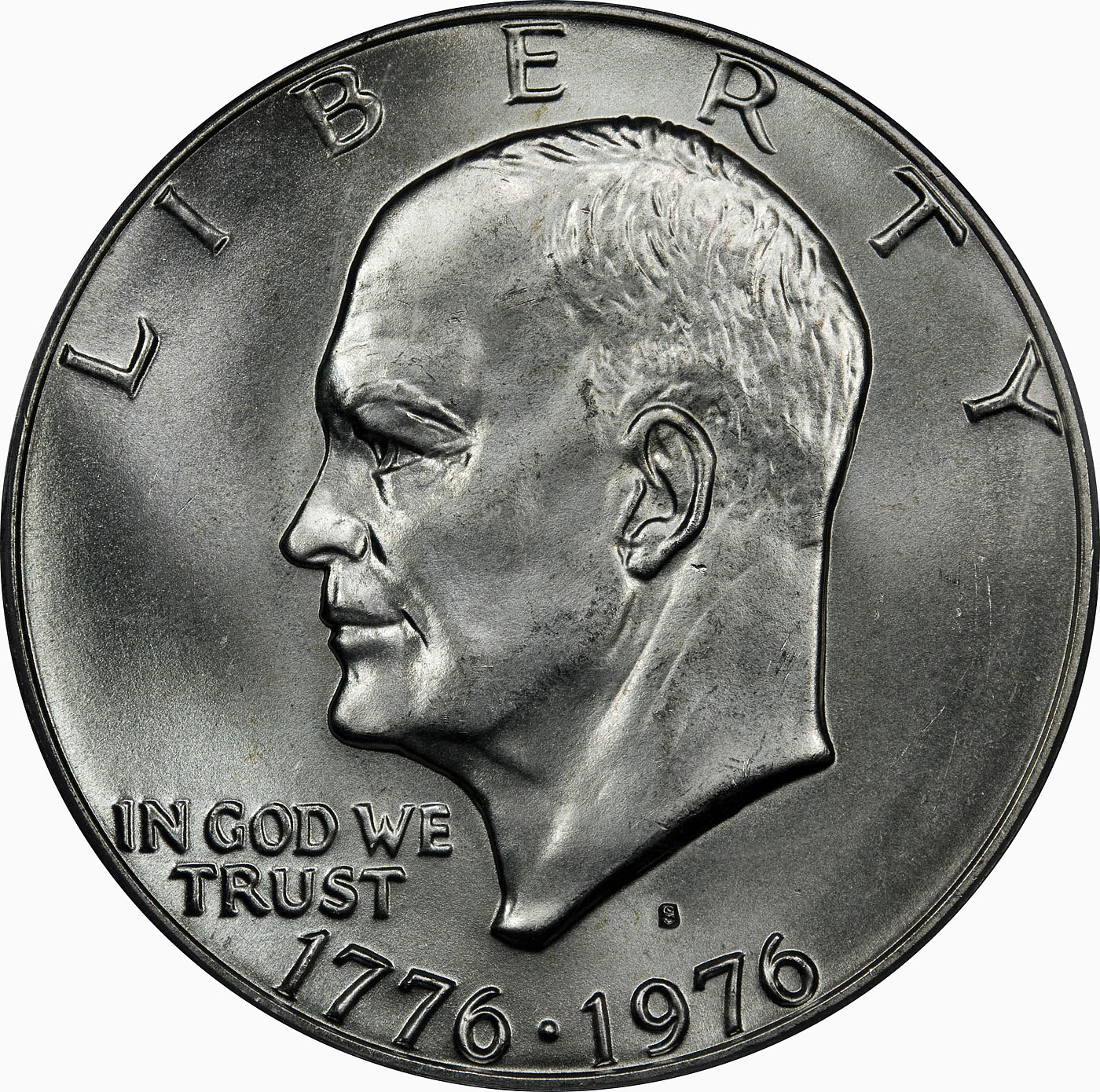
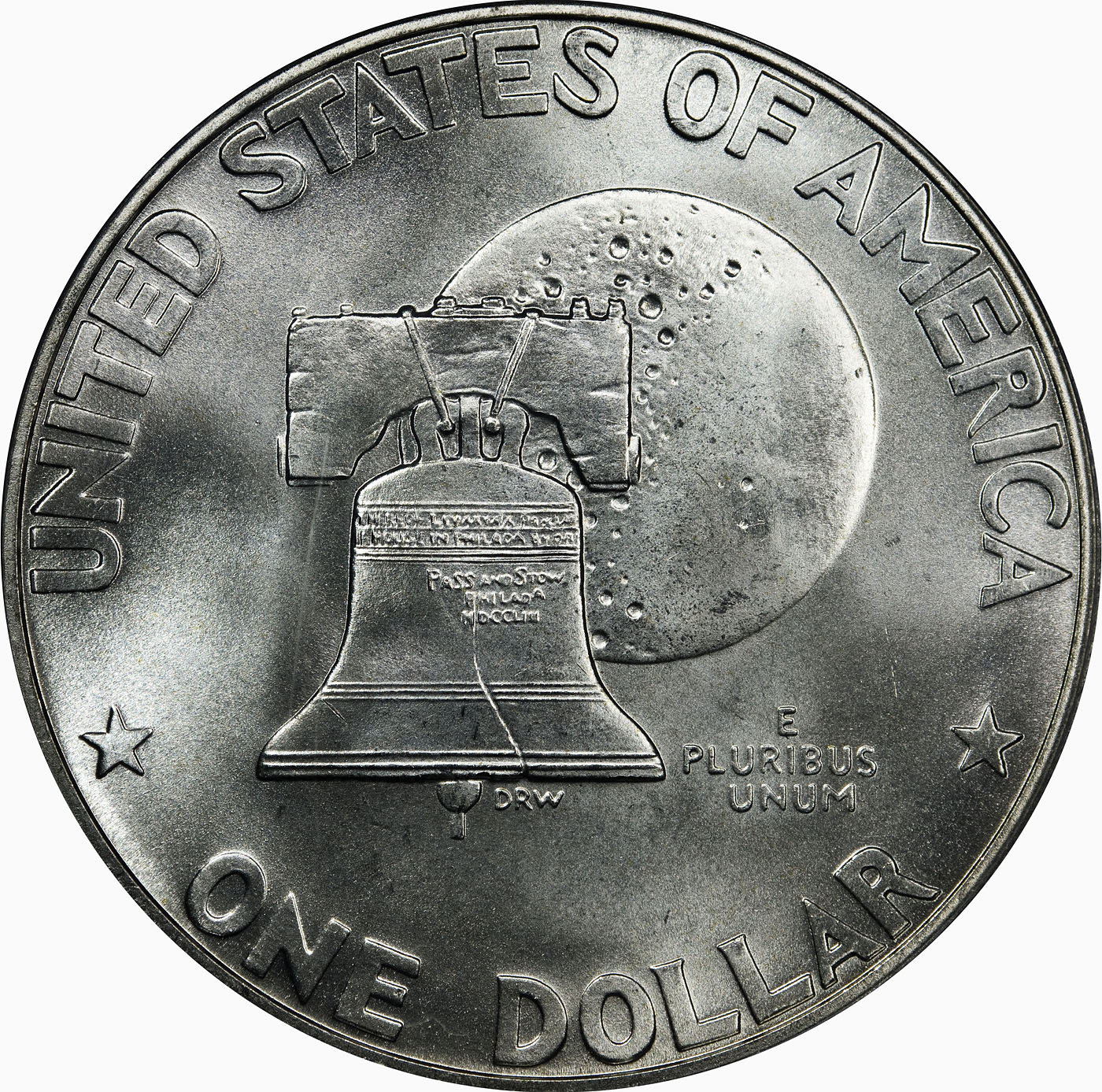
1976 Eisenhower dollar

From 1971 to 1978, the U.S. Mint issued dollar coins with the obverse depicting President Dwight D. Eisenhower and the reverse the insignia of the Apollo 11 moon landing, both designed by Chief Engraver Frank Gasparro. The United States Bicentennial coinage design, produced in 1975 and 1976, featured the Liberty Bell and the moon on the reverse, designed by Dennis R. Williams, while retaining the Eisenhower obverse, and the dual dates 1776–1976.

The Eisenhower dollars minted for general circulation contained no silver or gold but were instead composed of the same copper-nickel clad composition used for the dime, quarter, and half dollar. This made the circulation coins extremely resistant to wear. From 1971 to 1976, the Mint also produced dollars composed of 40% silver aimed at the collector market. The 1971–1974 issues appeared in brown boxes or blue packages, depending on whether they were proof or uncirculated. Somewhat different bicentennial sets were produced in the following two years. All issues remain very common.

The coins were never very popular, primarily because of their large size and weight which made them inconvenient to carry, and the fact that very few vending machines were designed to accept them. They saw the greatest use in casinos, and one-dollar tokens in many United States casinos still approximate the size and weight of the coins. Prior to the withdrawal of the coins, which remain legal tender (and are sometimes available at banks by request), many casinos did not strike their own tokens, but instead used the Eisenhower dollar.

=== Anthony dollar (1979–1981, 1999) ===
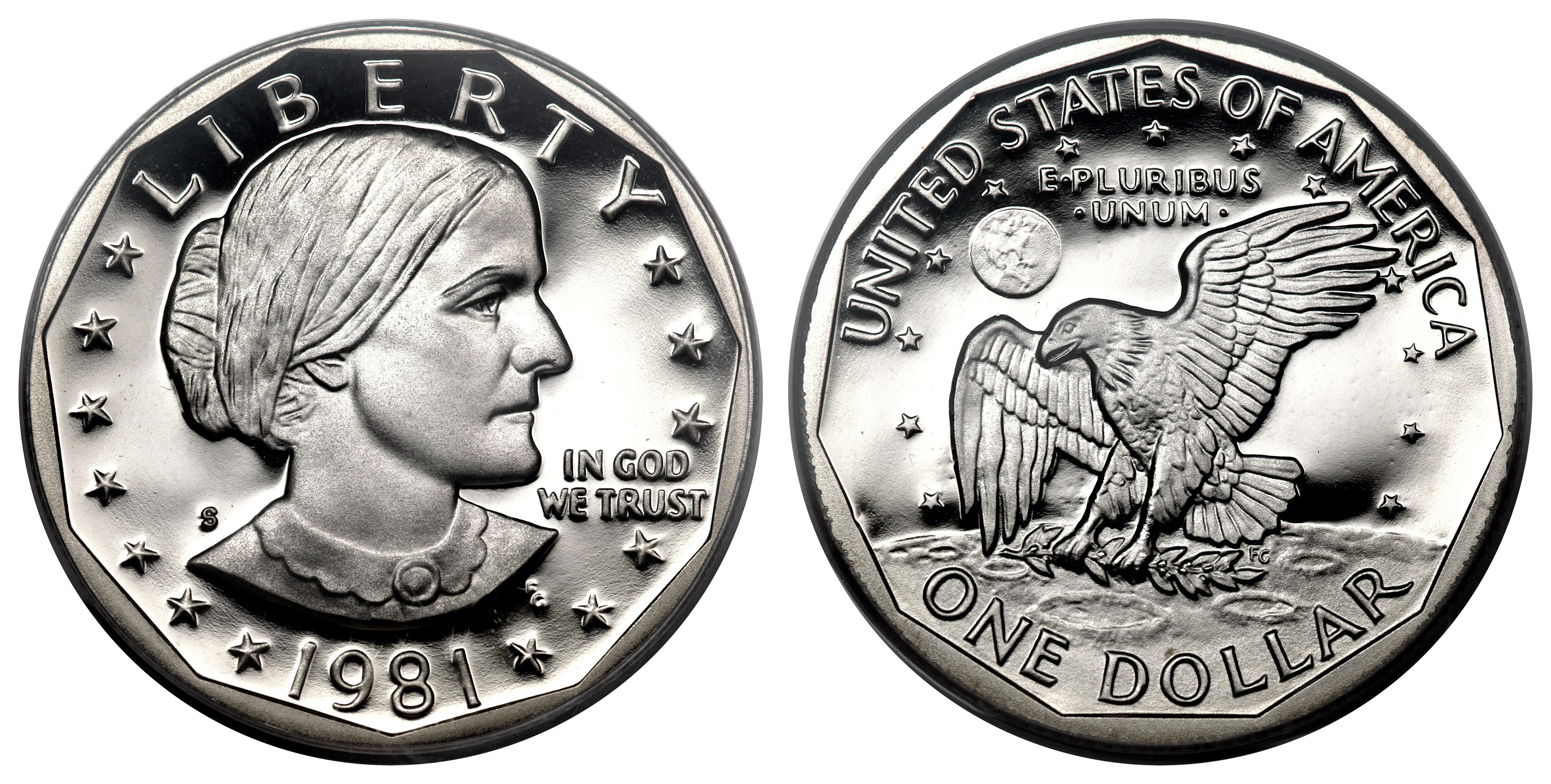
1981 Susan B. Anthony dollar

From 1979 to 1981, and again in 1999, the Mint produced the Susan B. Anthony dollar depicting women's suffrage activist Susan B. Anthony, also designed by Frank Gasparro. Anthony became the first historic woman portrayed on circulating U.S. coinage. Many earlier circulating coins had featured images of women via allegorical figures such as Peace or Liberty. Isabella I of Castile appeared on the 1893 Columbian Exposition quarter dollar but the coin was not intended for general circulation. The Anthony dollars, like the Eisenhower dollars, were made from a copper-nickel clad copper core. The 1981 coins were issued for collectors only but occasionally show up in circulation.

The Anthony dollar, because of its color, size, and design, was often confused with the quarter. It was never popular and production was suspended after 1981. In 1999, it was struck again when Treasury reserves of the coin were low and the Sacagawea dollar was still a year away from production. While reserves of the coins were high, the coins were most often seen in vending machines, transit systems, and post offices.

=== Sacagawea and Native American dollars (2000–present) ===
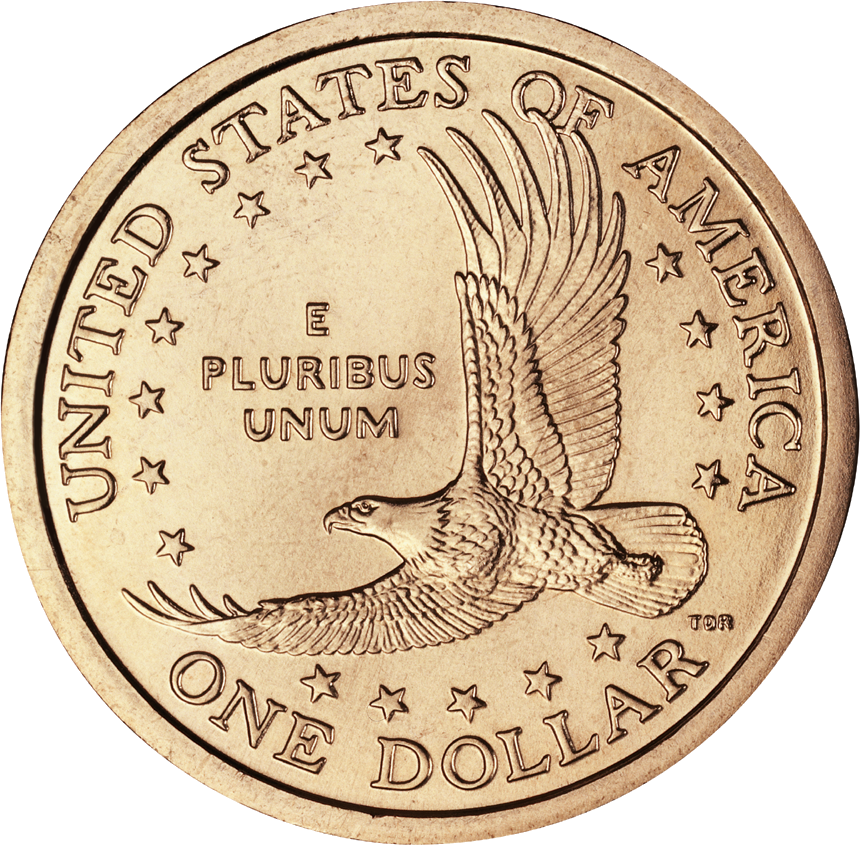
Reverse of the Sacagawea dollar from 2000–2008. Since 2009, the reverse has commemorated Native American contributions to U.S. history.

The Sacagawea dollar was authorized by Congress in 1997 to replace the Susan B. Anthony dollar, whose inventory was nearing depletion. Made with a copper core clad in manganese brass to achieve a golden color, the coins share the same size, weight, and electromagnetic properties as the Anthony dollar. The obverse was designed by artist Glenna Goodacre and honors Native American explorer Sacagawea. Since no verifiable image of Sacagawea exists, Goodacre used Randy'L He-dow Teton as a model for the coin.

There are approximately 1 billion Sacagawea coins in circulation and about 250 million in reserve. The U.S. Mint greatly reduced production of Sacagawea dollars after the 2001 minting, citing sufficient inventory. As of 2022, dollar coins are not widely encountered in U.S. commerce, except in vending machines for rides on mass transit, some pay and display machines, some laundromats, and old-fashioned slot machines. On the other hand, the Sacagawea dollar has achieved popularity in El Salvador, Ecuador, and Panama, where the U.S. dollar is also the official currency.

In 2007, the Native American $1 Coin Act directed the Mint to produce annual Sacagawea dollar designs honoring Native American contributions to U.S. history, beginning in 2009. Notable design changes include moving the year, mint mark, and motto "E Pluribus Unum" to the coin's edge to allow more space for artwork, while "In God We Trust" remains on the obverse. Congress also mandated that at least 20% of all dollar coins minted during the Presidential $1 Coin Program be Sacagawea dollars bearing these new designs.

=== Presidential dollars (2007–2016; 2020) ===
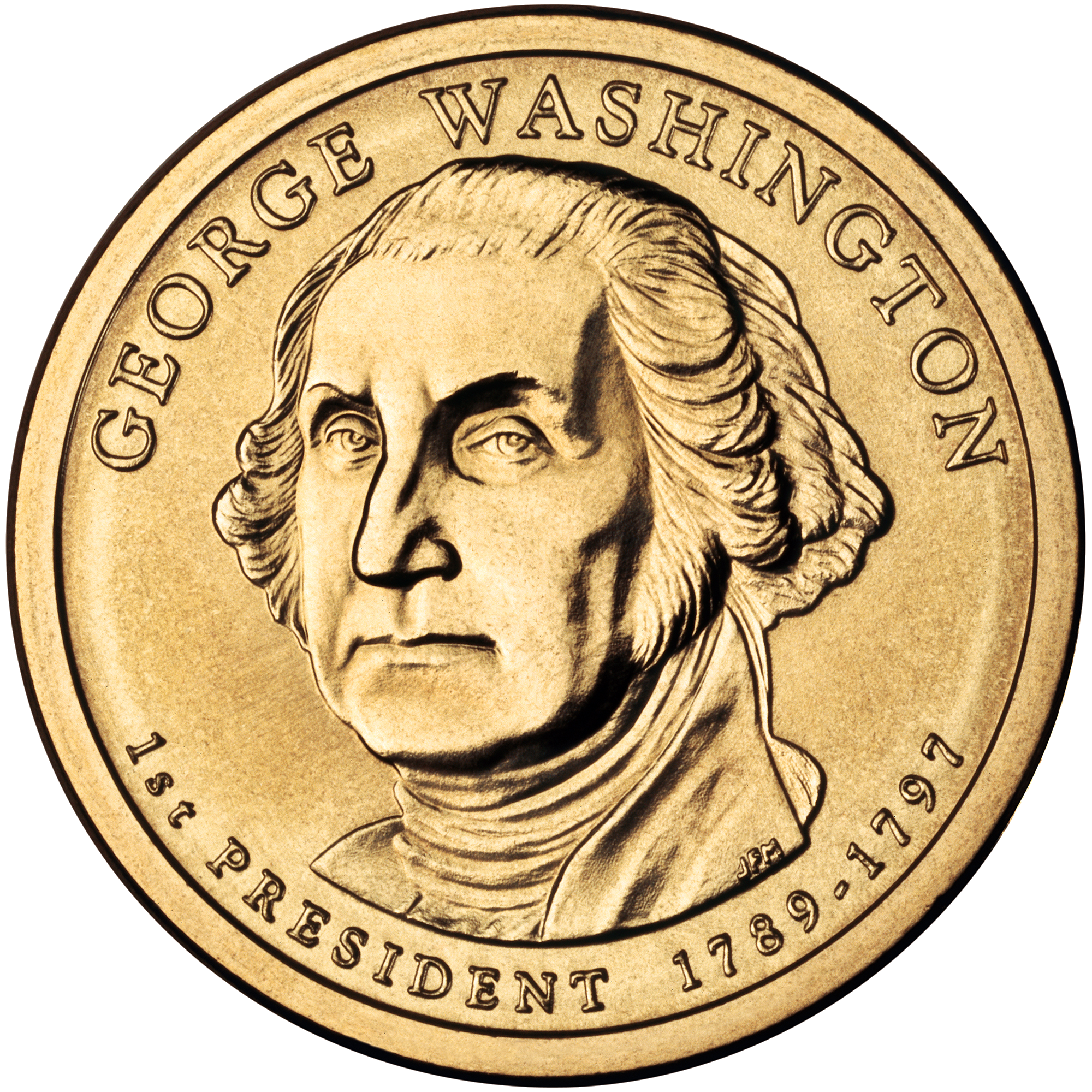
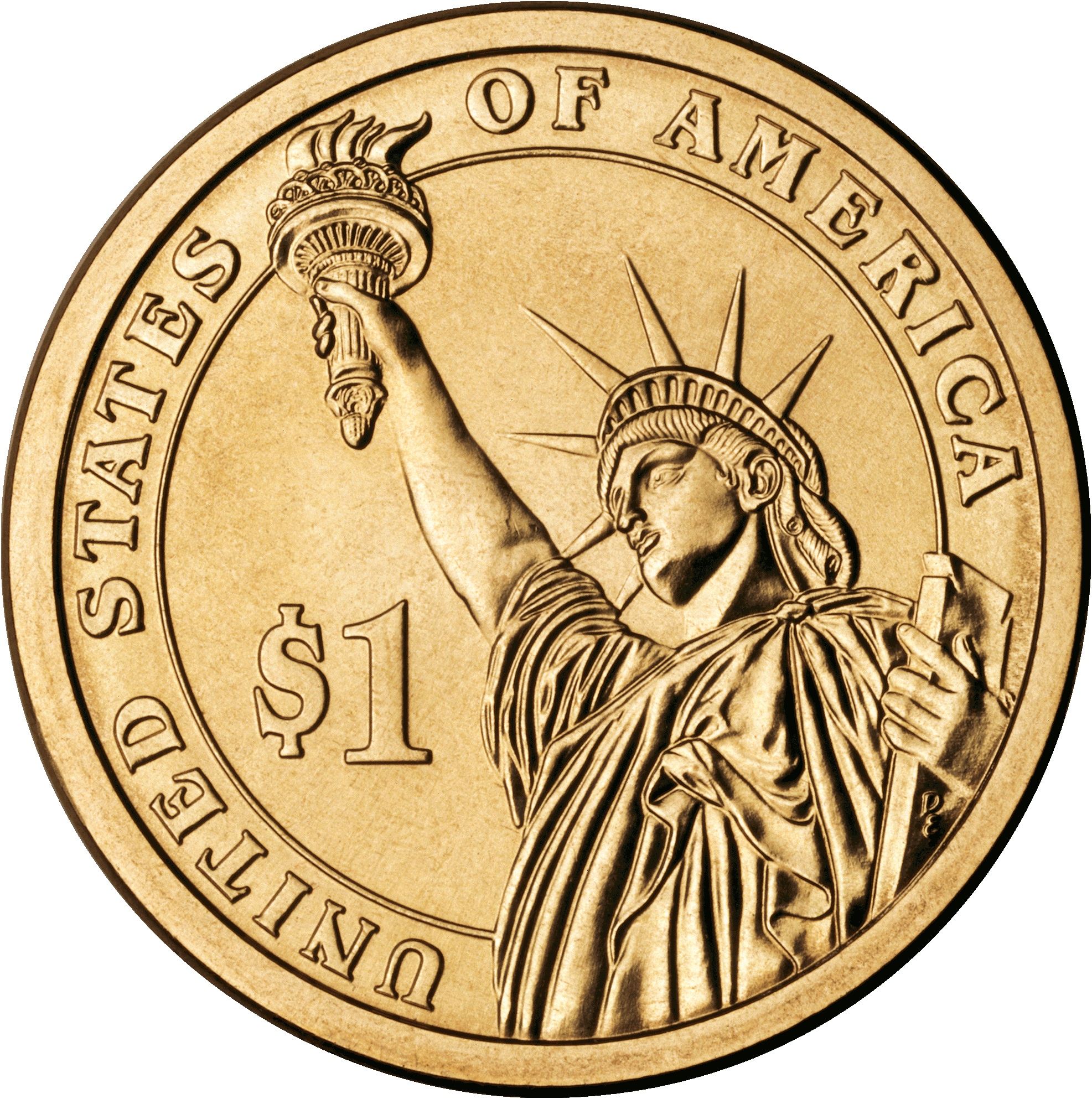
Obverse (left) and reverse (right) of the George Washington dollar coin

In 2005, Congress authorized a new series of $1 coins that would honor the former U.S. presidents. Portraits of the presidents are featured on the obverse, and the Statue of Liberty is on the reverse. Under federal law (31 U.S.C. § 5112), no coins may be issued featuring a living president, or a president who died less than two years earlier. The presidential dollar coin is the same size and composition as the Sacagawea dollar. "In God We Trust", the issue year, and the mint mark appear on the edge. The first dollar, honoring first U.S. president George Washington, was released into circulation on February 15, 2007. H.R. 2764 became law on December 26, 2007, and moved "In God We Trust" from the edge to the obverse.

From 2007 to 2011, presidential dollar coins were minted for circulation in large numbers. Because of budget constraints and increasing stockpiles of these relatively unpopular coins, the production of new presidential dollar coins for circulation was suspended on December 11, 2011, by Treasury Secretary Timothy Geithner. Further minting of these coins was reserved solely for collectors. From 2012 to 2016, new coins in the series were minted only for collectors. A new coin was released on December 4, 2020, to honor George H. W. Bush, who died after the original program ended.

=== American Innovation dollars (2018–present) ===
The American Innovation dollar series was authorized by Congress in 2018. Four new coins are being struck each year from 2019 to 2032 to commemorate significant innovations or innovators associated with each of the 50 states, the District of Columbia, and U.S. territories. The obverse features a recurring image of the Statue of Liberty, while the reverse changes with each issue. An introductory coin commemorating George Washington signing the country's first patent into law was released in December 2018. The coins are only being minted for collectors and are not intended for general circulation.

=== Semiquincentennial commemorative coin (2026) ===
In October 2025, the Mint confirmed that it was planning to issue a commemorative dollar coin in celebration of the 250th anniversary of the founding of the country the following year. Although the authorizing law explicitly prohibits using images of living or recently deceased (two years) presidents or former presidents on the reverse side of the coin, the proposed design for the coin featured images of incumbent President Donald Trump on both the obverse and reverse. The announcement stated that no final decision has been made regarding the design of the coin. Treasury secretary Scott Bessent announced the final design of the coin in July 2026, to be available late in the year. The coin features Trump on the obverse and a variant of the presidential seal on the reverse.

== Popularity ==
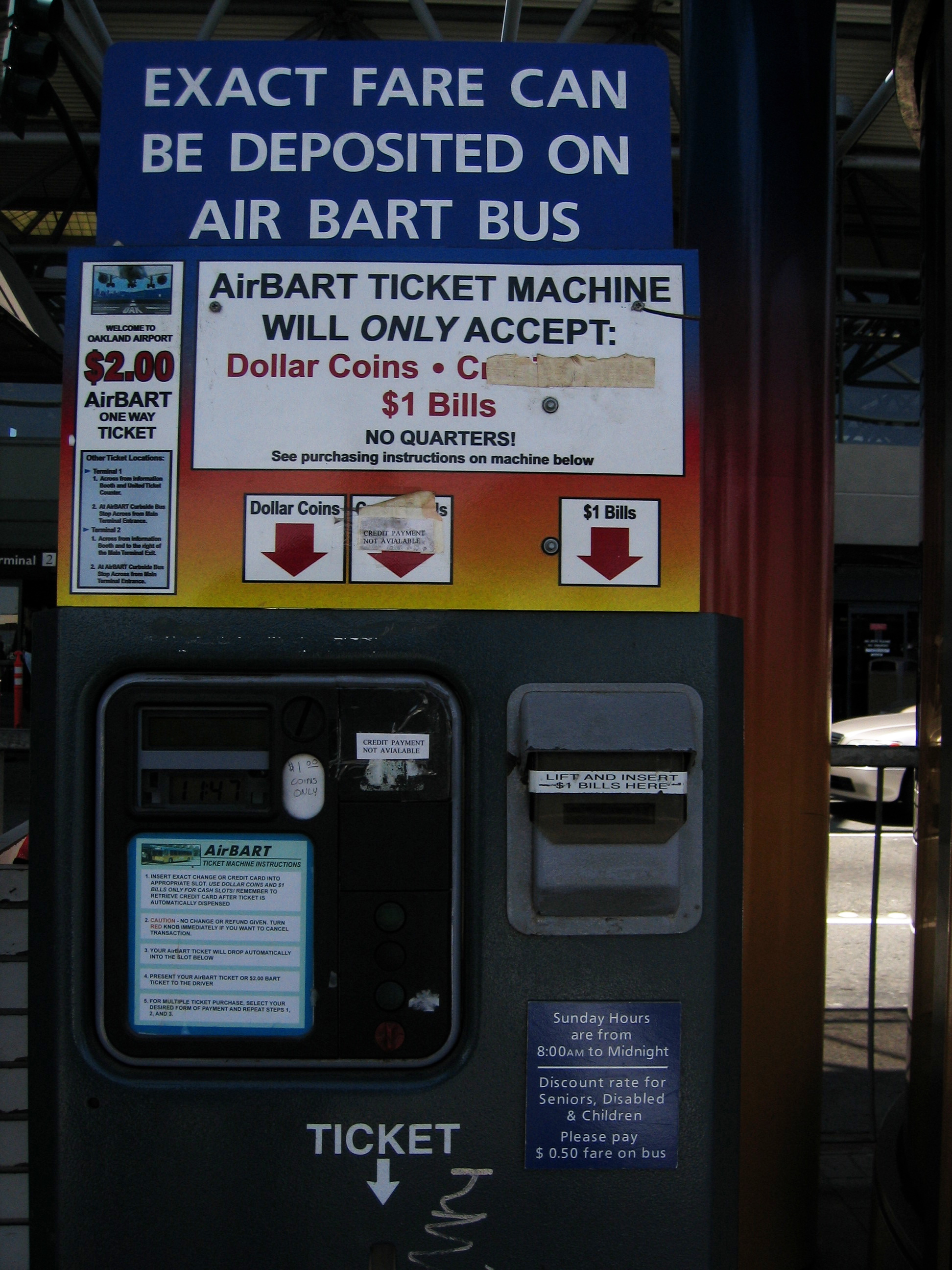
An AirBART machine that accepts dollar coins

One-dollar coins, both in silver and base-metal forms, have never been popular in circulation from the 19th century to the present, despite several attempts to increase their usage since the 1970s, for various reasons:

- From 1792 to 1803 the $1 coin compared favorably with the Spanish dollar and was accepted at par for overseas purchases. Its coinage was suspended in 1803 since it did not remain long in domestic circulation.
- During the 1850s California gold rush the silver dollar of 371.25 grains (24.057 g) was internationally worth more than the gold dollar of 23.22 grains (1.505 g) and was therefore exported (see Gresham's law). Likewise, the gold dollar of 1849–1889 was a tiny coin measuring only 13–15 millimetres (0.51–0.59 in) in diameter, making it difficult to grasp and easy to lose, a serious problem when one dollar was about a day's wage.
- While substantial numbers of silver Morgan dollars were minted from 1878 pursuant to the Bland-Allison Act, there also existed an option to hold silver certificates fully backed by silver dollars kept in reserves. The majority of citizens, therefore, opted to use silver certificates while most silver dollars languished inside treasury and bank vaults.

Succeeding base-metal $1 coins minted from 1971 onwards did not circulate widely as well, the most important reason being the continued circulation of the $1 bill.

- The copper-nickel clad Eisenhower dollar minted from 1971 to 1978 was not popular due to its large size relative to its gradually diminishing value;
- The smaller-sized Susan B. Anthony dollar coin minted from 1979 to 1981 and again in 1999, was highly unpopular because they were often mistaken for quarters, due to their nearly equal size, color and reeded edge;
- Sacagawea dollars and presidential dollar coins have been issued since 2000. These coins have a distinct weight, gold color, and smooth edge. Despite these remedies, golden dollars continue to circulate poorly since the $1 bill continues to be produced.

The non-acceptance of $1 coins in the United States contrasts with the practice in most other developed countries where denominations of similar value exist only in coins; for example, the lowest-value pound sterling, euro and Japanese yen notes are the £5 note, €5 note and 1000 yen note respectively; each is worth more than US$5. These high-value coins (such as the €2 coin, Canadian "toonie" or 5 Swiss francs) have largely succeeded because of the removal (or lack) of their corresponding paper issues, whereas the U.S. government has taken no action to remove the $1 bill.

The Government Accountability Office (GAO) has stated that discontinuing the dollar bill in favor of the dollar coin would save the U.S. government approximately $5.5 billion over thirty years primarily through seigniorage. The Federal Reserve has refused to order the coin from the mint for distribution citing a lack of demand, according to ex-Mint director Philip Diehl in November 2012.

Whatever the reason, a U.S. Mint official claimed in a November 2012 meeting that most of the 2.4 billion dollar coins minted in the previous five years were not in circulation. In 2019, the GAO re-estimated the cost of replacing the $1 bill and found for the first time that it would cause the government to lose between $611 million and $2.6 billion because physical money was being used less, resulting in dollar bills remaining in circulation longer compared to the 2011 analysis.

== List of designs ==
Silver dollar coins

- Flowing Hair dollar 1794–1795
- Draped Bust dollar 1795–1803
  - Draped Bust, Small Eagle 1795–1798
  - Draped Bust, Heraldic Eagle 1798–1803, 1804 (not a regular issue)
- Gobrecht dollar 1836–1839
- Seated Liberty dollar 1840–1873
  - Seated Liberty, no motto 1840–1865
  - Seated Liberty, with motto 1866–1873
- Trade dollar 1873–1878 (Business & Proofs struck), 1879–1885 (Proofs only)
- Morgan dollar 1878–1904, 1921
- Peace dollar 1921–1935
  - Peace dollar (high relief) 1921
  - Peace dollar (low relief) 1922–1928, 1934–1935
- American Silver Eagle 1986–present

Gold dollar coins

- Liberty Head (Small Size) 1849–1854
- Indian Head (Large Size) 1854–1889
  - Small Indian Head 1854–1856
  - Large Indian Head 1856–1889

Copper-nickel clad dollar coins

- Eisenhower dollar 1971–1974, 1977–1978
  - Eisenhower Bicentennial 1975–1976 (all dated 1976)
- Susan B. Anthony dollar 1979–1981, 1999

Manganese brass "golden" dollar coins

- Sacagawea dollar (eagle reverse) 2000–2008
  - Sacagawea dollar (Native American series) 2009–present
- Presidential dollar coins 2007–2016, 2020
- American Innovation dollars 2018–2032

== See also ==
- Modern United States commemorative coins
- United States $1 Coin Act of 1997
- United States Mint coin production
