= Rare Coin Wholesalers =

Rare-coin company that specializes in United States rare coins

- Type: Private
- Headquarters: Irvine, California, U.S.
- Key people: Steven Contursi; President
- Website: www.rcw1.com

Rare Coin Wholesalers is a rare-coin company that specializes in United States rare coins. Located in Irvine, California, Rare Coin Wholesalers buys, sells, appraises and trades rare coins and precious metals. Originally established as a S.L. Contursi company in 1990, the owners have bought and sold over two billion dollars' worth of rare coins.

Rare Coin Wholesalers sustains a rotating inventory of tens of millions of dollars' worth of rare numismatic coins. RCW has either owned or participate in the purchase and sale of a majority of the “100 Greatest U.S. Coins” published by Whitman Publishing. The Neil/Carter/Contursi 1794 Flowing Hair Silver Dollar, the King of Siam Proof Set and the Unique 1787 Brasher Doubloon are just a few of the rarities that RCW has had in its inventory.

== Notable transactions ==
In March 2004, the American Numismatic Association and the company's president, Steven Contursi, a professional numismatist since 1975, exposed new evidence about “Uncle Sam’s first buck.” This specific coin, named the Neil/Carter/Contursi specimen 1794 Flowing Hair Dollar, is believed by most experts to be the first silver dollar stuck in the U.S. Mint. In May 2010, Contursi sold the Neil/Carter/Contursi 1794 Silver Dollar for $7.85 million to the Josh Galt Group, which at the time, set a world record for the highest amount ever paid for any single coin.

In December 2011, the unique Brasher Doubloon, the first gold coin made for the young United States, was sold by Steven L. Contursi of Laguna Beach, California, to Certified Acceptance Corporation (CAC) of Far Hills, New Jersey. An undisclosed Wall Street investment firm subsequently has purchased it from Blanchard and Company of New Orleans, Louisiana for a record price of nearly $7.4 million, the most money ever paid for this historic rare coin. Most recently, Steve Contursi donated the 1792 Half Disme, an early American coin valued at more than $220,000, to the ANA's Money Museum.

In late December 2011, Steven L. Contursi, President of Rare Coin Wholesalers, donated a 1792 half disme, graded NGC About Uncirculated 58, to the American Numismatic Association's Edward C. Rochette Money Museum in Colorado Springs, Colorado. Contursi said he donated his coin to the ANA unrestricted, "with no strings attached," explaining that it was his way of "giving back" to an association he has "always believed in." When Contursi donated his coin, he was unaware that the example of the famed rarity was missing and presumed stolen from the museum's collection, which was later disclosed by ANA officials on January 19. Contursi has bought and sold a number of examples of the 1792 half disme during his career, ranging from the finest known, graded Mint State 68, to circulated specimens. In fact, he currently has one that grades MS-65 in his collection.

Steve Contursi purchased a 1907 gold coin that experts have called the most beautiful in U.S. currency on June 29, 2012. The coin, a Proof Ultra High Relief double eagle, was designed at the turn of the century by sculptor Augustus Saint-Gaudens after a request from President Theodore Roosevelt to bring more beauty into American coin design.
