= Steven Contursi =

American numismatist

Steven L. Contursi
- At a press conference in 2013
- Born: May 21, 1952 (age 74); The Bronx, New York, U.S.
- Occupation: President of Rare Coin Wholesalers

Steven L. Contursi (born May 21, 1952) is an American businessman and numismatist. He is the founder and president of Rare Coin Wholesalers. In the past 38 years, Steve Contursi has bought and sold over $1 billion worth of rare United States coins.

== Education ==
Steven graduated with a Cum Laude degree in physics from Lehman College of the City University of New York, as well as being honored with the 1974 Joseph A. Gillet Prize for being the top Physics student as a senior.

== Notable coins ==
In 2004, Contursi sought evidence for his coin to be the first silver dollar made for the United States, a 1794 Flowing Hair Silver Dollar. The coin was sold in May 2010, for $7.85 million, making it the most expensive coin ever sold.

In addition to owning the first silver dollar, Steven owned the first gold coin made for the U.S., the ‘Unique’ Brasher Doubloon. The coin was struck in 1787 by silversmith Ephraim Brasher, a neighbor of George Washington. With the “EB” stamped on the chest, it was sold in December 2011 to a Wall Street investment firm for $7.4 million.

In 2005, Steven purchased the King of Siam proof set for $8.5 million in a private sale.

In June 2012, Steven purchased the highest grade “Ultra High Relief” 1907 Saint Gaudens Double Eagle (PR69) nicknamed “America’s Most Beautiful Coin Design” by experts.

In late December 2011, Steven donated a 1792 half disme to the ANA Money Museum. The coin, purchased for $220,000, was donated with “no strings attached.” He said, “This donation is my way of giving back to the ANA for the wonderful things that they do for collectors.”

== See also ==
- List of most expensive coins
