= Flowing Hair dollar =

Coin minted by the United States from 1794 to 1795

- United States of America
- Value: 1 Dollar United States dollar
- Mass: 26.96 g (416 gr)
- Diameter: 39–40 mm (1.53–1.57 in)
- Edge: Lettered
- Composition: 90.00% Ag; 10.00% Cu
- Years of minting: 1794–1795

Obverse
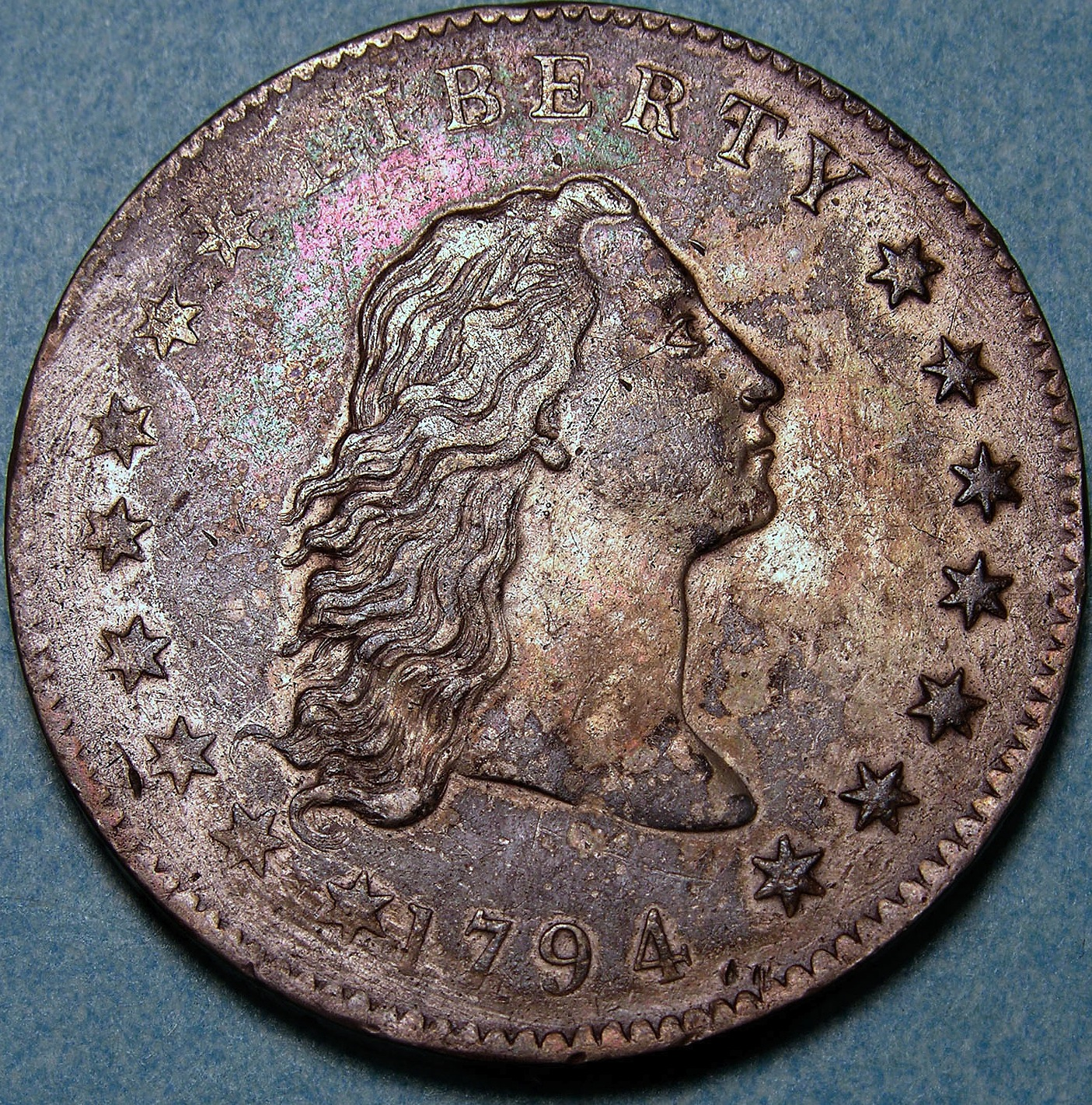
- Design: Bust of Liberty
- Designer: Robert Scot
- Design date: 1794

Reverse
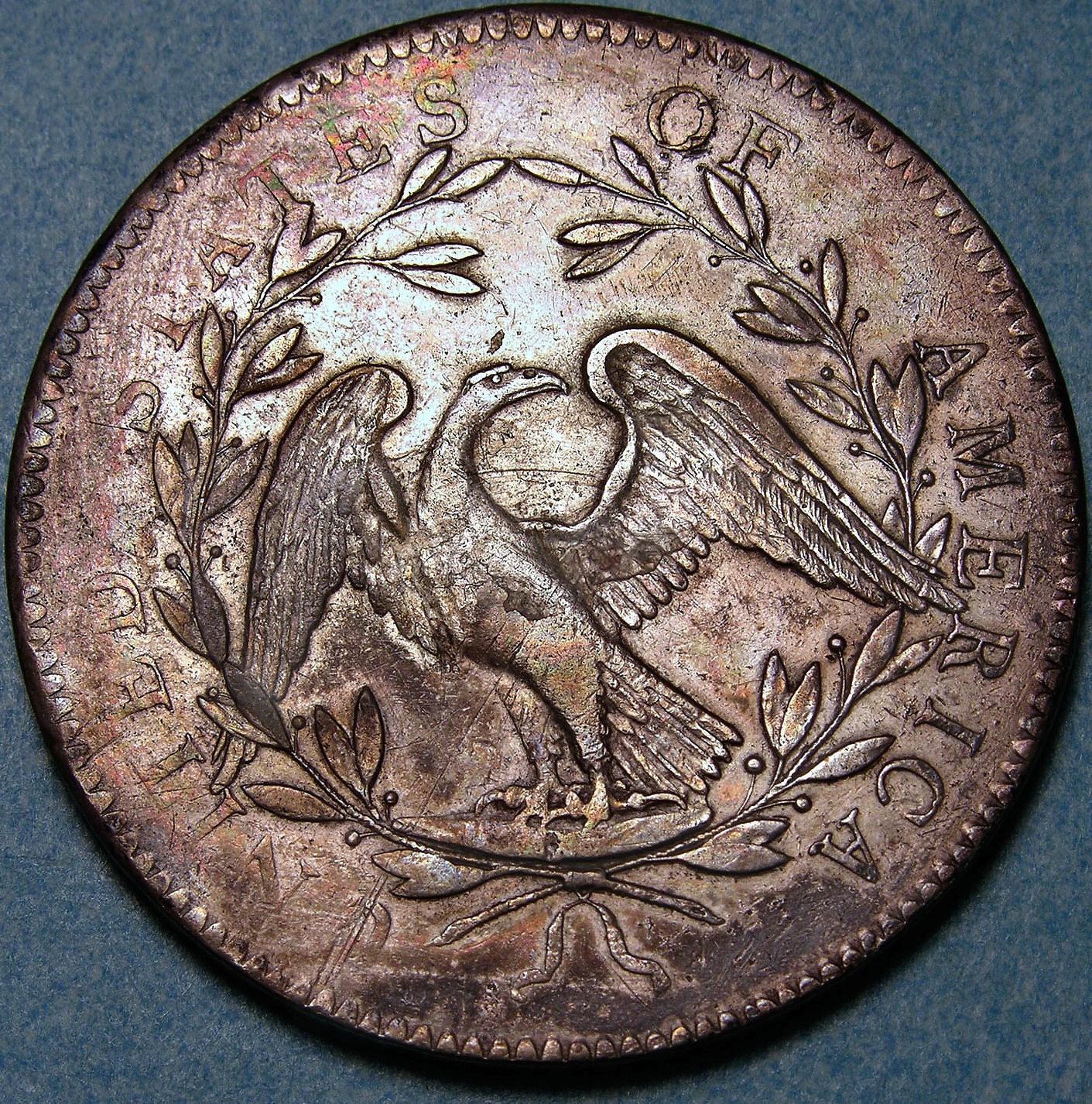
- Design: Eagle surrounded by wreath
- Designer: Robert Scot
- Design date: 1794

The Flowing Hair dollar was the first dollar coin issued by the United States federal government. The coin was minted in 1794 and 1795; its size and weight were based on the Spanish dollar, which in turn was based on the tolar minted in Bohemia since 1520. The Spanish dollar was popular in trade throughout the Americas.

In 1791, following a study by Alexander Hamilton, Congress passed a joint resolution calling for the establishment of a national mint. Later that year, in his third State of the Union address, President George Washington urged Congress to provide for a mint, which was officially authorized by the Coinage Act of 1792. Despite the authorization, silver and gold coins were not struck until 1794. The Flowing Hair dollar, designed by Robert Scot, was initially produced in 1794, and again in 1795. In October 1795 the design was replaced by the Draped Bust dollar.

== Background ==
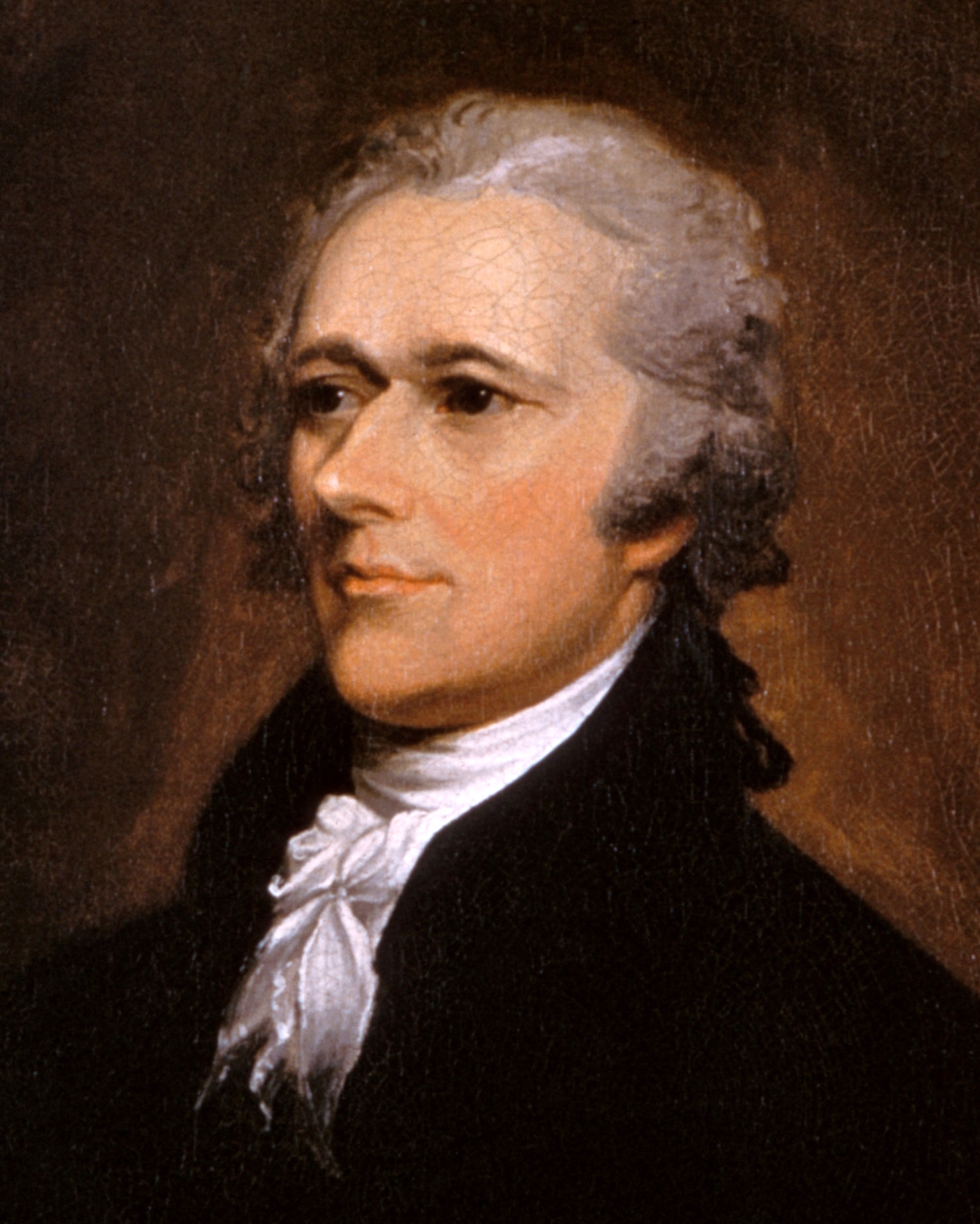
Secretary of the Treasury Alexander Hamilton compiled a report on the American monetary system prior to the establishment of the United States Mint.

Beginning in the 1780s, a large number of prominent Americans called for the establishment of a central mint to supply the United States with official coinage; all such proposals failed due in large part to lack of funds and opposition from individuals and groups who preferred that coins be struck by the individual states. Since there were no federal coins issued, the needs of the states were fulfilled by a variety of domestic and foreign coins and tokens, including Spanish peso, eight-real coins (popularly known as Spanish dollars or pieces of eight).

In 1789, the United States Constitution, which granted Congress the power "to coin Money, regulate the Value thereof, and of foreign Coin, and fix the Standard of Weights and Measures", was ratified and came into force. The following year, Congress began deliberating on the state of the nation's monetary system and coinage. On January 28, 1791, Treasury Secretary Alexander Hamilton presented a report to Congress detailing the findings of a study he had conducted on the monetary system and the potential of a United States mint. As part of his study, Hamilton had a series of assay tests of Spanish dollars performed, as that was the coin upon which the United States monetary system would be based. After viewing the results, the secretary recommended that the silver content of the United States dollar be based on the average silver content of the pesos tested. Hamilton's recommendation was that the dollar should contain 371.25 grains of silver and have a gross weight of 416 grains, the balance being copper. On March 3, 1791, after reviewing Hamilton's report, Congress passed a joint resolution authorizing a federal mint; the resolution, however, gave no specifics or appropriations.

=== Establishment of the Mint ===
In his third annual address to Congress, later known as the State of the Union address, delivered on October 25, 1791, in Philadelphia, President George Washington urged members of Congress to put the joint resolution approved earlier that year into immediate effect:

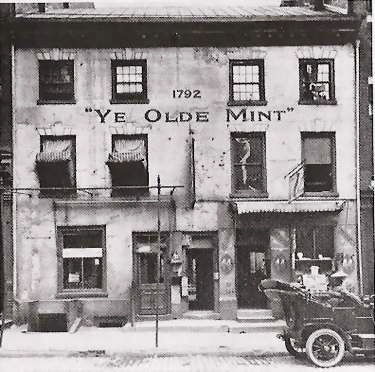
The Philadelphia Mint, established in 1792, struck its first coins in February 1793. (Photo 1908)

The disorders in the existing currency, and especially the scarcity of small change, a scarcity so peculiarly distressing to the poorer classes, strongly recommend the carrying into immediate effect the resolution already entered into concerning the establishment of a mint. Measures have been taken pursuant to that resolution for procuring some of the most necessary artists, together with the requisite apparatus.

In response, the Senate appointed a committee chaired by Robert Morris to draft the necessary specifications and legislation that would officially create a federal mint and coinage. The committee presented a bill before Congress on December 21, 1791, which stated in part that the new dollar coin (which was to form the basis of the United States monetary system) should contain 371 grains of silver and a total weight of 416 grains, as Hamilton had earlier recommended. The new silver coins were to be struck in an alloy containing 1,485 parts out of 1,664 (about 89.24 percent) fine silver, with the remainder copper, intended to equal the silver in Spanish dollars. However, an assay of the Spanish dollars was in error—they were in fact 65/72 silver (about 90.28 percent) with the remainder copper.

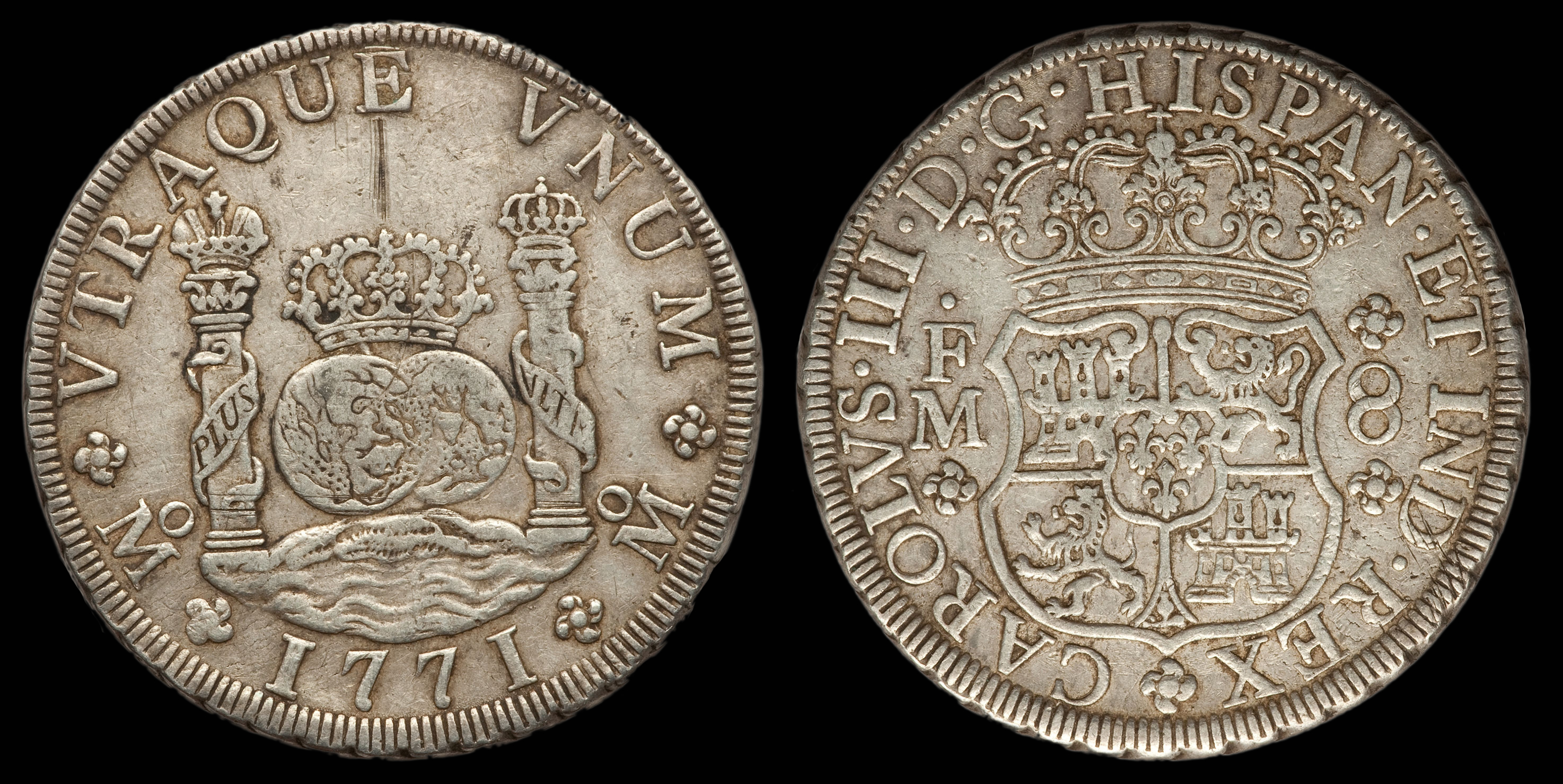
The Spanish dollar was the basis of the United States silver dollar.

One provision in Morris' legislation called for President Washington to be depicted on the obverse side of every coin struck by the new mint. The bill passed the Senate after debate, but it was altered in the House of Representatives to instead call for the head of an allegorical figure representing Liberty to appear. Upon returning to the Senate, the upper house insisted on its version of the design provision. The House rejected the provision for the second time and passed another version of the bill, after which the Senate concurred. The law, known as the Coinage Act of 1792, was signed into law on April 2, 1792, by President Washington. The Act provided for the creation of the United States Mint, and appropriated money to meet the cost of construction of an appropriate facility, and for salaries for employees and officials. The denominations sanctioned under the Act were half cents, cents, half dimes, dimes, quarter dollars, half dollars, dollars, quarter eagles, half eagles and eagles. On July 31, 1792, the foundation stone of the Philadelphia Mint was laid by newly appointed Mint Director David Rittenhouse. Machinery and personnel began occupying the new building by September 1792, and production began on cents in February 1793. In the first year of production at the Mint, only copper coins were minted, as the prospective assayer could not raise the required $10,000 surety to officially assume the position; the 1792 Coinage Act stated that both the chief coiner and assayer were to "become bound to the United States of America, with one or more sureties to the satisfaction of the Secretary of the Treasury, in the sum of ten thousand dollars". Later that year, Secretary of State Thomas Jefferson appealed to Congress that the amount of the bonds be lowered. On March 3, 1794, Congress lowered the bonds to $5,000 and $1,000 for chief coiner and assayer, respectively.

== Production ==
=== Design creation ===
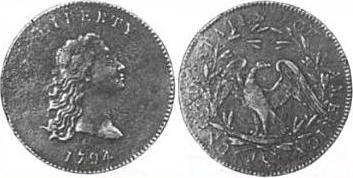
A pattern for the Flowing Hair dollar, struck in copper without the obverse stars of the circulating issues

Early in 1794, engraver Robert Scot began preparing designs for the silver dollar. Scot's initial design depicted a bust of Liberty, while his reverse featured an eagle, both required by the 1792 Coinage Act. Scot's design closely followed his design for the cent, but with the Phrygian cap removed. Government officials later instructed Scot to include a wreath around the eagle and to move the denomination from the reverse face to the edge of the coin. After receiving approval, Scot began engraving the hubs for the new silver dollar. Extra care was taken during the engraving of this denomination, because the dollar would be the largest American coin, and would thus receive the most scrutiny from foreign nations. The lettering was executed by Frederick Geiger, who had worked as a typographer for various books and newspapers. After the dies were created, several copper test pieces were struck. Officials decided to add fifteen stars around the periphery, representing the fifteen states that had ratified the Constitution to that point, to the right-facing Liberty on the obverse.

=== Minting ===
Now that mintage of the silver denominations could begin, the Mint began seeking depositors to bring in silver and gold bullion to be coined. After receiving several deposits, assayer Albion Cox notified Rittenhouse of his beliefs that the .892 standard approved for silver coinage was difficult to produce and that it would darken if put into circulation. Instead, Cox recommended that the purity be modified to .900 fine, but also that the weight be kept at 416 grains. This meant that the new alloy was contrary to statute and that all depositors would be overcharged for their silver bullion deposits, as there was a higher silver content in the coins than was allowed by the Coinage Act of 1792. The Mint's action cost suppliers of silver about one percent of their deposit; the largest depositor, John Vaughan, reckoned his loss at $2,260. Congress approved his petition for reimbursement in 1800, after several delays.

Before the coins could be struck, the edge lettering and devices had to be impressed on the edge of the planchets. This action was performed with a device known as the Castaing machine; the machine stamped the edge with the words "Hundred Cents One Dollar or Unit" along with ornamentation. As production was inexact, many planchets intended for silver dollars were overweight. This was remedied by filing the face of the planchets; for this reason, the coins vary in weight more dramatically than later issues, which were minted with more precise equipment.

The first silver dollars were struck on October 15, 1794. The silver used for the 1794 dollars came solely from silver ingots deposited with the Mint by Mint Director David Rittenhouse on August 22, 1794. Per a handwritten coin transfer warrant issued by Director Rittenhouse on October 15, 1794, 1,758 silver dollars were transferred from the custody of Chief Coiner Henry Voigt to the custody of Mint Treasurer Dr. Nicholas Way. Also on October 15, per a handwritten coin return warrant issued by Director Rittenhouse, the 1,758 silver dollars were transferred from the custody of Mint Treasurer Dr. Nicholas Way to David Rittenhouse, as a partial coin return towards his August 22 silver deposits. The 1,758 coins that were struck by Chief Coiner Henry Voigt, though acceptable, were poorly struck due to issues with the coining press that was used during early production at the Mint. It was a man-powered screw press intended for use on coins no larger than a half dollar.

On October 16, 1794, after receiving a silver dollar from David Rittenhouse, Secretary of State Edmund Randolph forwarded the dollar coin to President Washington for his inspection. In an attempt to help circulate the coins, Rittenhouse spent many of the new coins and traded them for foreign coins to market the new products of the Mint. Others were distributed to VIPs and distinguished visitors to the Mint. After the initial production, Rittenhouse ordered all dollar coin production to end until Mint personnel could build a more powerful press that would be capable of better striking the coins. The Columbian Centinel (Boston, MA) first wrote an article about the new dollar coins on November 26, 1794:

Some of the new dollars now coining at the Mint of the United States have found their way to this town. A correspondent put one in into the editor's hands yesterday. Its weight is equal to that of a Spanish dollar, but the metal appears finer ... The tout ensemble (entire design) has a pleasing effect to a connoisseur, but the touches of the [en]graver are too delicate, and there is a want of that boldness of execution which is necessary to durability and currency

The new coinage press was completed in early 1795, and the first group of dollars, totalling 3,810 coins, was delivered on May 6. The coins struck on May 8 may have borne a 1794 date, however there is no document or evidence to support such a statement. A number of 1795 dollars (along with one 1794 issue) are known to have been struck with a silver plug set into the center, measuring approximately 8 millimetres (0.31 in). It is believed that this was done to correct the weight of underweight planchets. The total mintage for the second and final year of production is estimated at 160,295. In total, 203,033 silver dollars were struck in 1795, but it is unknown exactly how many of those were of the Flowing Hair type, as the Draped Bust dollar succeeded it in October 1795; the Draped Bust dollar was designed by portraitist Gilbert Stuart at the behest of Rittenhouse's successor as Mint Director, Henry DeSaussure.

== Collecting ==
Throughout its history, the 1794 dollar has widely been considered one of the rarest and most valuable of all United States coins. In a September 1880 issue of The Coin Journal, the author noted that a good quality specimen of the 1794 dollar was valued at fifty dollars, equal to $1,668 today. In the early 1990s, numismatic historian Jack Collins estimated the surviving number of the coins to be between 120 and 130. In 2013, the finest known example, which was among the earliest coins struck and was prepared with special care, was sold at auction for $10,016,875, the highest selling price of any coin in history. The dollar was graded Specimen-66 by the Professional Coin Grading Service, noting the special conditions under which it was struck. The coin, which had previously been owned by Colonel E.H.R. Green, was sold by Stack's Bowers Galleries in a public auction in January 2013. It was previously sold in 2010 for what was then a record sum of $7.85 million, to the Cardinal Collection Educational Foundation. Steven Contursi, a former owner of the coin, said that it was a "national treasure" and that he was proud to have been its "custodian" from 2003 until its sale in 2010. Martin Logies, representative of the foundation that purchased the coin, said that of all the rarities he had seen, he believed that one was the "single most important of all".

== Bibliography ==
- Breen, Walter (1988). Walter Breen's Complete Encyclopedia of U.S. and Colonial Coins. New York, N.Y.: Doubleday. ISBN 978-0-385-14207-6. OL 4404444M.
- Julian, R.W. (1993). Bowers, Q. David (ed.). Silver Dollars & Trade Dollars of the United States. Wolfeboro, New Hampshire: Bowers and Merena Galleries. ISBN 0-943161-48-7.
- Preston, Robert E. (1896). History of the Monetary Legislation and of the Currency System of the United States. Philadelphia, Pennsylvania: John J. McVey.
- Taxay, Don (1983) [1966]. The U.S. Mint and Coinage (reprint ed.). New York, New York: Sanford J. Durst Numismatic Publications. ISBN 978-0-915262-68-7.
- The Statesman's Manual. Vol. 1. New York, New York: Edward Walker. 1858.
- Yeoman, R.S. (2010). A Guide Book of United States Coins (63rd ed.). Atlanta, Georgia: Whitman Publishing. ISBN 978-0-7948-2767-0.

Preceded by None	Dollar coin of the United States (1794, 1795); With: Draped Bust dollar (1795)	Succeeded by Draped Bust dollar
