= Numismatic history of the United States =

History of coin collecting in the United States

The numismatic history of the United States began with Colonial coins such as the pine tree shilling and paper money; most notably the foreign but widely accepted Spanish piece of eight, ultimately descended from the Joachimsthaler and the direct ancestor of the U.S. Dollar.

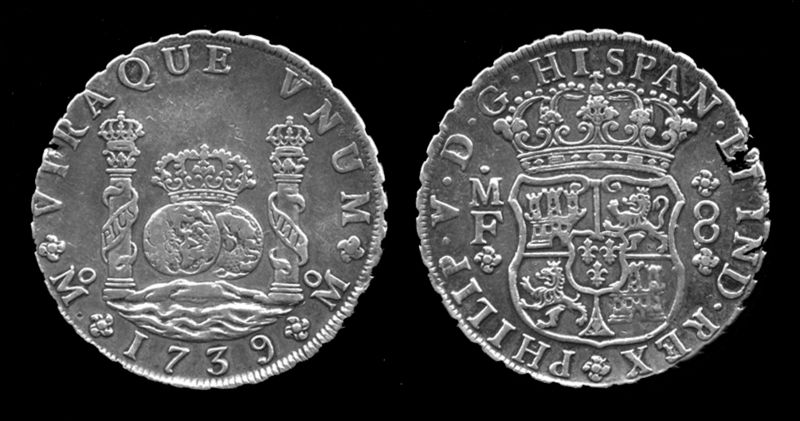
The Spanish Piece of Eight, used widely as currency in Colonial America and the ancestor of American coinage

Paper money was not printed by the United States until 1861.

== American coinage (1792–c. 1837) ==
The Coinage Act of 1792 established the United States Mint and regulated the coinage of the United States. The act created coins in the denominations of Half Cent (1/200 of a dollar), Cent (1/100 of a dollar, or a cent), Half Dime (also known as a half disme) (five cents), Dime (also known as a disme) (10 cents), Quarter (25 cents), Half Dollar (50 cents), Dollar, Quarter Eagle ($2.50), Half Eagle ($5), and Eagle ($10).

The first coin minted under the act, and therefore the first official coin of the United States, was the half disme. According to legend these first half disme coins were minted from Martha Washington's silverware.

The half cent and cent were made of pure copper, the half dime, dime, quarter, half, and dollar in 90% silver, and the quarter, half and full eagle in .9167 gold (later changed to .8992 in 1834, and then 90% gold in 1837). All of the coins featured Liberty on the front and a bald eagle on the back.

This period of coinage covers several designs. The Draped Bust design was featured on all copper and silver coins minted between 1796-1807. On silver coins other than the dollar this design was followed by the Capped Bust.

In the early days, often years went by without a certain denomination being minted.

== Seated Liberty era and introduction of the Double Eagle, Nickel and small cent (1836–1891) ==
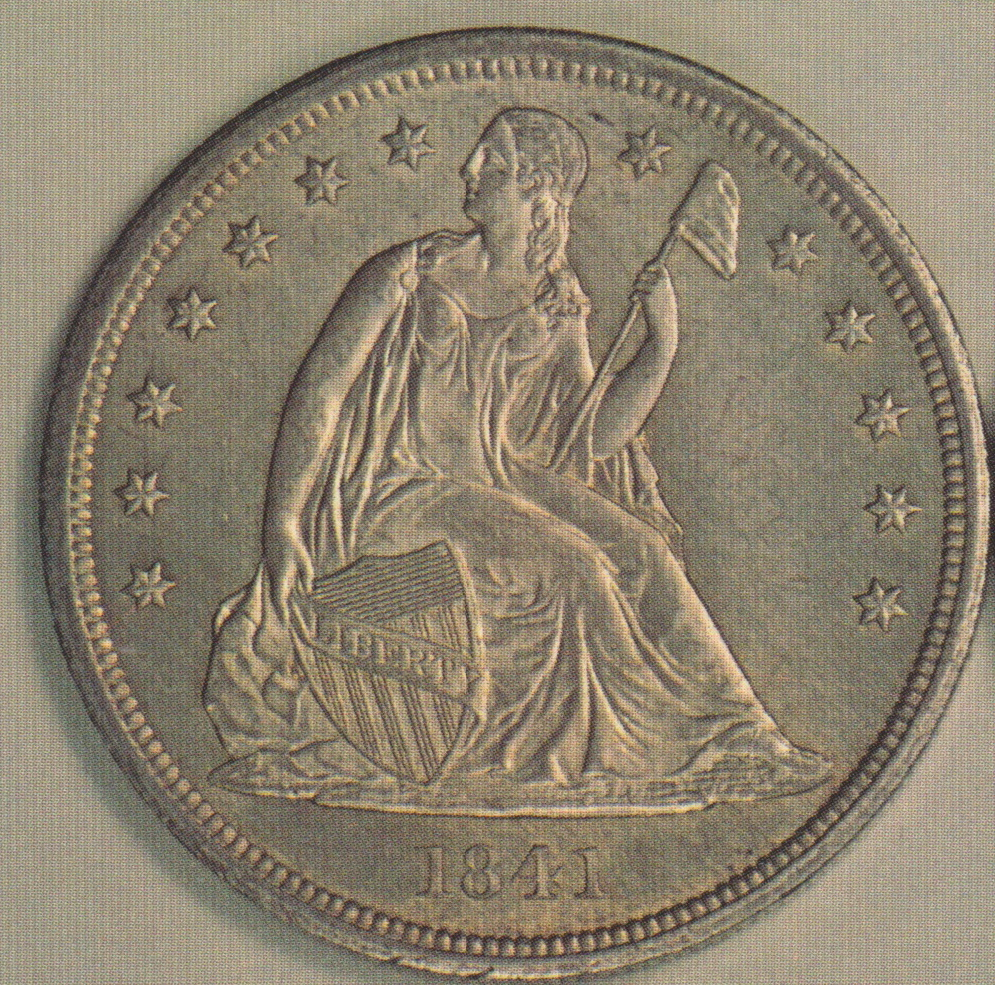
Seated Liberty dollar

United States Seated Liberty coinage was the silver coin design minted in the mid-to-late 19th century. It was the first seated-portrait U.S. coin, now-scarce Seated Liberty Dollar, and debuted in 1836. The seated liberty dime and seated liberty half dime followed the next year in 1837 and the seated liberty quarter and seated liberty half dollar in 1839.

In 1849, in the wake of the California Gold Rush, the Double Eagle, or $20 gold denomination was added This coin contains nearly a pure ounce of gold and were minted in large quantities; many still exist today and are used as bullion coins. The Liberty Head Double Eagle was minted up to 1907.

Rising copper prices caused the reduction of the size of the large cent. Originally, cent coins were large and heavy. This changed between 1856 and 1857 when they were replaced by the small-sized Flying Eagle cent, which was made of 88% copper and 12% nickel, and had a somewhat pale brown color. In 1859 this was replaced by the Indian Head cent, and by 1864, the Civil War increased nickel and copper prices and the cent was made thinner and the nickel removed; the cent was thus now a small, thin bronze coin.

The five cent nickel coin was introduced in 1866, and gradually it made the half dime obsolete. To this day, the nickel, though the design has changed, retains the same metallic content it had from its inception: ~25% nickel, ~75% copper.

The second half of the 19th century saw several odd coin denominations. The two cent piece was minted from 1864 to 1873. It was the first American coin to display the phrase In God We Trust, a result of the increased wartime religiosity during the Civil War. Three cent pieces made of silver, and later copper-nickel, were also made around this era. From 1875 to 1878, Twenty cent pieces were made in the Seated Liberty design. A Three-dollar piece of gold was minted from 1854 to 1889.

In 1878, the first Morgan Silver Dollars were minted; this series lasted until 1904 and was revived for several months in 1921.

== Turn of the 20th century coinage, the introduction of paper money and the end of gold coins (1892–1932) ==
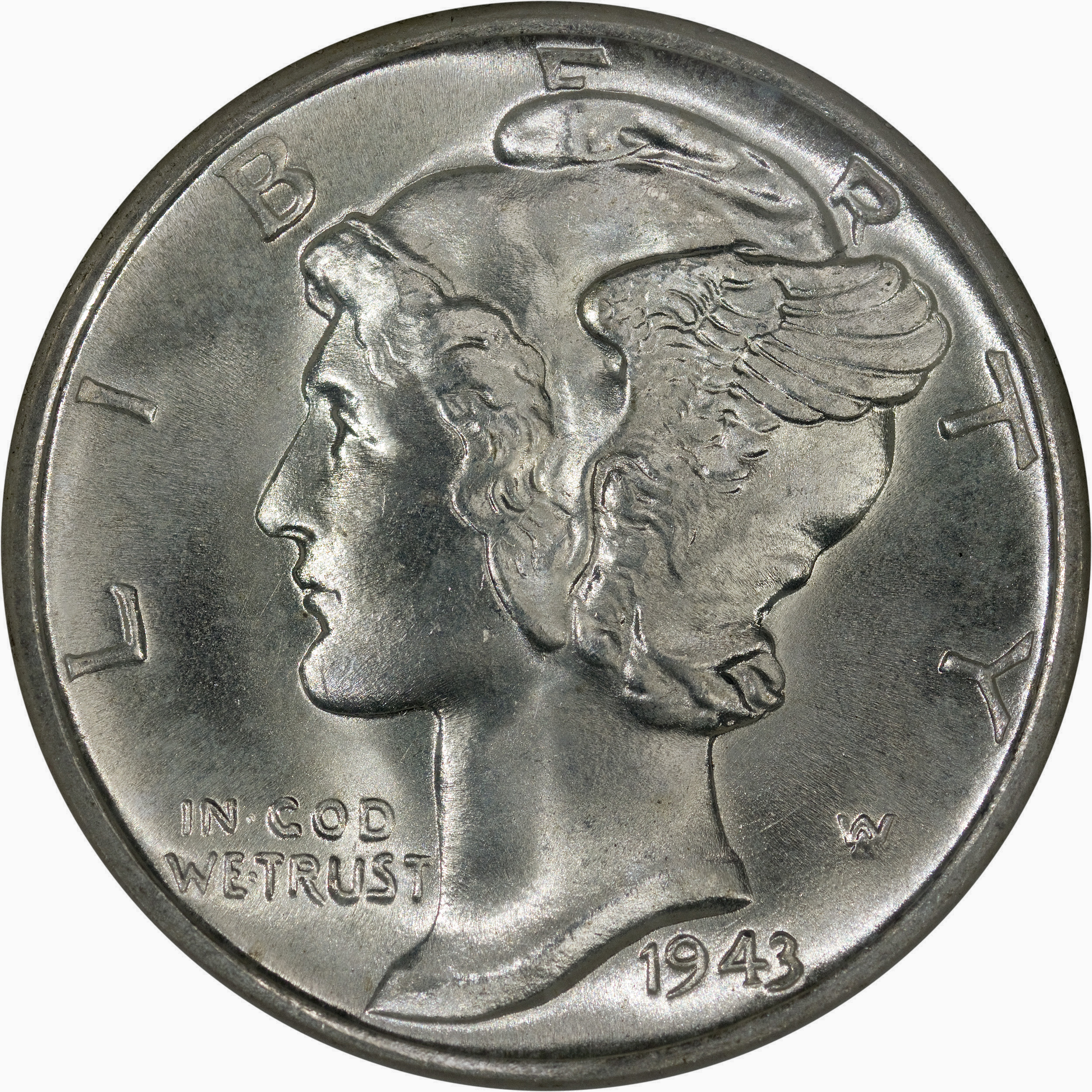
A mercury dime

The year 1892 saw the designs of Charles E. Barber adorn the dime, quarter and half dollar. His Liberty Head nickel had debuted in 1883, and thus from the years 1892 to 1904, his designs were featured on every denomination from 5 cents up to one dollar. The Barber design lasted on dimes and quarters up to 1916, on half dollars up to 1915, and on the nickel up to the extremely rare and famous 1913 Liberty Head nickels. The 1892 Columbian Exposition Commemorative Half Dollar, engraved by Barber, was the first American coin that featured the face of an actual person (rather than Liberty).

Federal Reserve Notes were issued for the first time in 1914. Originally, these were backed by gold, and a note could be, at least in theory, exchanged for gold coin at a bank until 1933 when gold was confiscated from the general public. Silver certificates were exchangeable for silver coin up to June 1968.

The design of the American One dollar bill has stayed almost the same since 1935, and the other denominations had a similar appearance until their redesign in the late 1990s.

The Gold Eagle was re-designed in 1907 as the Indian Head eagle and the $2.50 and $5 pieces followed in 1908. The Liberty Head Double Eagle was replaced with the St. Gaudens Double Eagle in 1907. The wheat penny, with the head of Lincoln on the obverse, was introduced in 1909. Also, the Buffalo nickel and Mercury dime were both introduced in the 1910s (1913 and 1916, respectively).

The Peace Dollar was minted from 1921 to 1935. After 1935, no more silver dollars were minted for circulation by the US Mint. 90% silver dimes, quarters and half dollars were replaced with copper-nickel coins after 1964. From 1965 to 1976, 40% silver coins were issued in certain denominations. Of these, only the 1965 to 1969 dated Kennedy Half Dollars were minted for general circulation. No precious metals were present in any coins issued after 1977 by the US Mint until the bullion and commemorative series that began in the 1980s and continue to the present day.

== Mid-to-late 20th century and the end of silver coinage (1933–c. 1998) ==
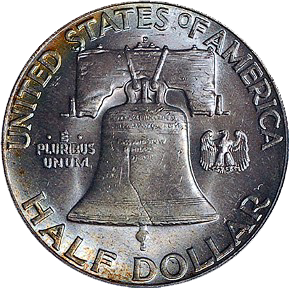
Reverse side of a Franklin Half Dollar

As there were no more gold coins or silver dollars after the Executive Order 6102 of 1933 minted in the United States, paper notes took place of the coin denominations above 50 cents. Up to 1964, dimes, quarters and half dollars were still minted in 90% silver; halves contained 40% silver from 1965 to 1970.

The new tradition of placing past presidents and Founding Fathers on coins, which had begun with the 1909 Lincoln cent, continued in the 1930s and 1940s, with the introduction of the Washington quarter in 1932, the Jefferson nickel in 1938, the Roosevelt dime in 1946, and the Franklin half dollar in 1948. The original Washington quarter design remained unchanged, aside from the removal of silver content and finer details, up to 1998, the Jefferson nickel up to 2003, and the Roosevelt dime to the present day. The Franklin half was replaced by the John F. Kennedy half dollar in 1964 to commemorate him after his murder. The composition of the Kennedy half dollar was changed from 90% silver to 40% silver in 1965 and remained that way through 1970. After 1970, Kennedy half dollars were made of the same copper-nickel alloy as the other denominations.

The last 90% silver circulated coins are dated 1964, though they were actually minted for several years later dated as 1964. In 1982, the penny had most of its copper content removed, and is now made primarily of zinc, with a thin copper plating.

The paper money of the United States was re-designed to deter counterfeit through the late 1990s and early to mid-2000s.

== Contemporary (1999–present) ==
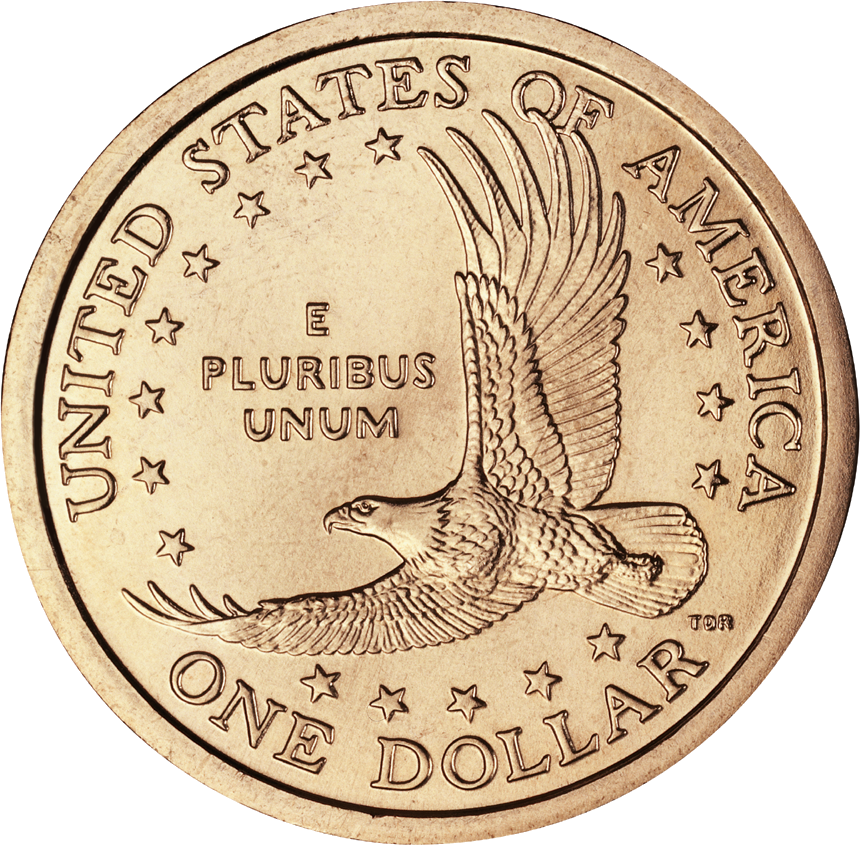
Sacagawea Dollar reverse

American coinage and paper money has gone through significant changes since the late 1990s. Up to the mid-1990s, American money had changed little since the end of silver coins in the mid-1960s, and some of the denominations, including the paper notes and the nickel, had barely changed since the 1930s.

Beginning in 1996 with the $100 and $50 bills, paper money was redesigned to deter counterfeiting. In 1999, the State Quarter program ended the classic design of the Washington quarter. Next came the 2004 nickels, meant to commemorate Lewis and Clark's 200th anniversary. The cent was re-designed in 2009 to commemorate Abraham Lincoln's 200th birthday. After 2009, the Shield Penny design, representing how Lincoln preserved the Union, appeared on the reverse of pennies.

The dollar coin returned in 1999, in a case very similar to the 1921 Morgan dollar, with the Susan B. Anthony dollar, to fill in until the Sacagawea dollar came about in 2000. Concurrent is the Presidential dollar series, which ended its production in the fall of 2016. The American Innovation dollar was introduced in late 2018.
