= United States Mint coin production =

This table represents the mintage figures of circulating coins produced by the United States Mint since 1880. This list does not include formerly-circulating gold coins, commemorative coins, or bullion coins. This list also does not include the three-cent nickel, which was largely winding down production by 1880 and has no modern equivalent.

United States Mint Coin Production
Year	1¢	5¢	10¢	25¢	50¢	$1	Total coins	Value in $	
1880	38,961,000	16,000	36,000	13,600	8,400	27,396,000	66,431,000	27,797,610.00	
1881	39,208,000	68,800	24,000	12,000	10,000	27,927,000	67,249,800	28,332,920.00	
1882	38,578,000	11,472,900	3,910,000	4,400	5,000	27,573,000	81,543,300	28,927,025.00	
1883	45,591,500	22,952,000	7,674,673	14,400	8,000	28,469,000	104,709,573	30,847,582.30	
1884	23,257,800	11,270,000	3,930,474	8,000	4,400	28,136,000	66,606,674	29,329,325.40	
1885	11,761,594	1,472,700	2,576,187	13,600	5,200	28,697,000	44,526,281	29,151,869.60	
1886	17,650,000	3,326,000	6,583,208	5,000	5,000	31,423,000	58,992,208	32,427,870.80	
1887	45,223,523	15,260,692	15,737,679	10,000	5,000	33,611,000	109,847,894	36,405,037.73	
1888	37,489,832	10,167,901	7,215,655	1,226,001	12,001	31,990,000	88,101,390	33,907,359.62	
1889	48,866,025	15,878,025	8,352,678	12,000	12,000	34,651,000	107,771,728	36,777,829.30	
1890	57,180,114	16,256,532	11,334,027	80,000	12,000	38,042,514	122,905,187	40,586,544.44	
1891	47,070,000	16,832,000	23,046,116	6,204,000	200,000	23,562,085	116,914,201	28,829,996.60	
1892	37,647,087	11,696,897	16,952,410	11,840,079	2,353,028	6,332,000	86,821,501	13,125,090.47	(Note: In 1892, the Barber design was used for the 10¢, 25¢, and 50¢ coins.)
1893	46,640,000	13,368,000	7,591,401	10,294,558	3,955,000	1,455,000	83,303,959	7,900,079.60	
1894	16,749,500	5,410,500	2,050,000	8,932,821	7,334,960	3,093,000	43,570,781	9,636,705.25	
1895	38,341,474	9,977,822	2,250,000	9,020,681	3,708,424	862,000	64,160,401	6,078,688.09	
1896	39,055,431	8,841,048	3,185,056	5,546,039	3,014,948	19,876,000	79,518,522	23,921,096.06	
1897	50,464,392	20,426,797	12,877,377	10,097,029	4,045,900	12,651,000	110,562,495	20,011,928.72	
1898	49,821,284	12,530,292	20,152,507	13,988,592	6,191,550	14,386,000	117,070,225	24,118,901.14	
1899	53,598,000	26,027,000	24,367,493	15,976,000	8,948,411	15,182,000	144,098,904	27,924,284.80	
1900	66,831,502	27,253,733	24,778,270	15,290,585	10,066,322	19,960,000	164,180,412	33,324,635.92	
1901	79,609,158	26,487,228	25,072,687	10,576,664	6,239,044	22,566,000	170,550,781	32,957,409.68	
1902	87,374,704	31,487,581	27,950,000	18,469,579	8,908,670	18,160,000	192,350,534	32,474,855.84	
1903	85,092,703	28,004,930	28,293,300	14,205,309	6,298,772	10,343,000	173,238,014	22,124,216.78	
1904	61,326,198	21,403,167	15,400,357	12,044,143	4,662,638	8,812,000	123,648,503	17,377,810.78	
1905	80,717,011	29,825,124	24,806,822	8,081,523	3,661,000	0	147,091,480	8,629,989.26	
1906	96,020,530	38,612,000	29,764,371	8,991,760	10,852,154	0	184,240,815	13,541,259.40	
1907	108,137,143	39,213,325	34,536,470	15,596,000	11,650,000	0	209,132,938	16,219,684.68	
1908	33,441,367	22,684,557	23,099,000	17,048,000	11,658,828	0	107,931,752	13,869,955.52	
1909	117,684,088	11,585,763	14,481,000	16,442,000	5,057,400	0	165,250,251	9,842,420.85	(Note: In 1909, both the Indian Head and Lincoln designs were used for the 1¢ coins.)
1910	152,843,813	30,166,948	16,250,000	3,744,000	2,366,000	0	205,370,761	6,780,785.53	
1911	117,874,054	39,557,639	33,599,000	5,641,600	3,373,080	0	200,045,373	9,613,462.49	
1912	82,992,915	34,946,569	34,429,300	5,108,000	5,220,800	0	162,697,584	9,907,587.60	
1913	98,434,504	73,656,186	20,270,000	1,974,800	1,326,000	0	195,661,490	7,850,854.34	(Note: In 1913, both the Liberty Head and Buffalo designs were used for 5¢ coins.)
1914	80,567,067	28,046,463	31,682,230	3,934,230	1,116,000	0	145,345,990	6,917,774.32	
1915	55,973,970	30,060,220	6,580,000	7,878,000	2,912,400	0	103,404,590	6,146,450.70	
1916	190,298,627	88,690,466	57,204,080	8,380,800	2,130,400	0	346,704,373	15,218,317.57	(Note: In 1916, both the Standing Liberty and Barber designs were used for the 25¢ coins.)
1917	284,169,785	65,527,019	91,962,000	37,857,600	21,503,400	0	501,019,804	35,530,348.80	
1918	370,614,634	45,330,314	68,654,800	32,692,800	20,769,040	0	538,061,588	31,395,862.04	
1919	588,935,000	76,395,000	54,529,000	15,104,000	3,679,000	0	738,642,000	20,777,500.00	
1920	405,665,000	82,200,000	92,021,000	37,826,400	12,547,000	0	630,259,400	33,098,850.00	
1921	54,431,000	12,220,000	2,310,000	1,916,000	1,002,000	87,736,473	159,615,473	90,102,783.00	(Note: In 1921, both the Peace and Morgan designs were used for the $1 coins.)
1922	7,160,000	0	0	0	0	84,275,000	91,435,000	84,346,600.00	
1923	83,423,000	41,857,000	56,570,000	11,076,000	2,178,000	56,631,000	251,735,000	69,073,080.00	
1924	89,394,000	28,315,000	37,940,000	16,892,000	0	13,539,000	186,080,000	23,865,690.00	
1925	188,909,000	46,271,100	36,577,000	12,280,000	0	11,808,000	295,845,100	22,738,345.00	
1926	189,658,000	51,301,000	40,508,000	15,732,000	0	11,267,700	308,466,700	23,713,130.00	
1927	185,886,000	47,141,000	37,662,000	13,284,000	2,392,000	2,982,900	289,347,900	15,482,010.00	
1928	182,512,000	36,783,000	31,041,000	10,607,000	1,940,000	1,992,649	264,875,649	12,382,769.00	
1929	277,140,000	52,570,000	35,734,000	14,262,000	2,903,200	0	382,609,200	13,990,400.00	
1930	221,801,000	28,284,000	8,613,000	7,188,000	0	0	265,886,000	6,290,510.00	
1931	24,742,000	1,200,000	6,210,000	0	0	0	32,152,000	928,420.00	
1932	19,562,000	0	0	6,248,800	0	0	25,810,800	1,757,820.00	(Note: In 1932, the Washington design was used for 25¢ coins.)
1933	20,560,000	0	0	0	1,786,000	0	22,346,000	1,098,600.00	
1934	247,526,000	27,693,003	30,852,000	35,439,252	12,977,000	3,534,557	358,021,812	25,827,980.15	
1935	331,090,000	81,656,000	85,147,000	43,924,000	16,019,800	3,540,000	561,376,800	38,439,300.00	
1936	379,382,000	158,741,000	112,842,000	50,502,000	20,750,400	0	722,217,400	46,015,770.00	
1937	394,100,000	102,941,000	80,746,000	28,537,600	13,288,000	0	619,612,600	30,941,050.00	
1938	191,872,000	35,997,000	35,817,000	12,304,000	4,601,600	0	280,591,600	12,677,070.00	(Note: In 1938, both the Buffalo and Jefferson designs were used for 5¢ coins.)
1939	383,696,000	130,759,000	102,674,000	43,260,000	13,631,800	0	674,020,800	38,273,210.00	
1940	781,140,000	259,715,000	108,108,000	46,745,600	13,706,000	0	1,209,414,600	50,147,350.00	
1941	1,108,078,000	300,142,000	263,814,000	111,826,800	43,538,400	0	1,827,399,200	102,195,180.00	
1942	950,084,000	154,500,000	315,450,000	138,967,200	71,499,800	0	1,630,501,000	119,262,540.00	(Note: In 1942, both the copper-nickel and 35% silver planchets were used for 5¢ coins.)
1943	1,093,838,670	390,519,000	324,059,000	137,495,600	77,986,000	0	2,023,898,270	136,237,136.70	
1944	2,148,338,000	173,099,000	343,124,000	132,116,800	46,879,000	0	2,843,556,800	120,919,430.00	
1945	1,488,553,000	215,505,100	240,665,000	103,717,601	51,624,800	0	2,100,065,501	101,469,085.25	
1946	1,505,445,000	219,968,200	344,193,500	66,712,800	17,993,000	0	2,154,312,500	86,146,910.00	(Note: In 1946, the Roosevelt design was used for 10¢ coins.)
1947	484,305,000	157,542,000	203,195,000	43,476,000	7,994,600	0	896,512,600	47,905,950.00	
1948	571,942,500	145,382,000	163,311,000	67,922,800	7,035,414	0	955,593,714	49,818,032.00	(Note: In 1948, the Franklin design was used for 50¢ coins.)
1949	435,197,500	106,866,000	70,484,000	19,380,400	13,478,600	0	645,406,500	28,328,075.00	
1950	726,090,000	12,426,030	117,373,114	56,279,730	15,773,723	0	927,942,597	41,576,306.90	
1951	1,045,941,000	56,788,000	192,039,102	87,850,902	39,973,302	0	1,422,592,306	74,452,096.70	
1952	1,070,705,004	115,198,000	265,559,593	102,283,093	52,113,693	0	1,605,859,383	94,650,529.09	
1953	1,139,105,000	125,733,500	229,103,120	88,664,520	27,716,520	0	1,610,322,660	76,612,427.00	
1954	419,382,550	194,251,110	243,267,203	108,552,425	43,627,183	0	1,009,080,471	87,184,799.05	
1955	938,447,500	82,352,100	44,919,181	21,362,581	2,498,181	0	1,089,579,543	24,583,733.85	
1956	1,518,946,100	102,438,940	216,655,100	76,478,500	4,032,000	0	1,918,550,640	63,112,543.00	
1957	1,333,882,000	175,236,900	273,514,330	124,456,160	25,110,850	0	1,932,200,240	93,121,563.00	
1958	1,053,478,300	185,337,120	168,474,600	84,484,900	28,004,412	0	1,519,779,332	71,772,530.00	
1959	1,889,475,000	187,986,240	250,699,790	30,589,432	19,253,750	0	2,378,004,212	70,638,274.00	
1960	2,167,289,000	247,998,180	270,550,400	92,164,324	24,239,812	0	2,802,241,716	96,288,826.00	
1961	2,506,611,700	302,982,860	302,876,550	120,692,928	28,566,442	0	3,261,730,480	114,959,368.00	
1962	2,399,193,400	377,579,720	407,398,380	163,710,756	45,187,281	0	3,393,069,537	147,132,087.50	
1963	2,528,130,400	455,681,105	545,126,530	209,604,184	89,233,292	0	3,827,775,511	199,595,704.25	
1964	6,447,646,500	2,815,919,922	2,286,877,180	1,264,526,113	429,509,450	316,076	13,244,795,241	965,162,508.35	(Note: In 1964, and the Kennedy design was used for the 50¢ coins. $1 coins dated 1964 were struck at Denver in 1965, though all were subsequently melted at the mint.)
1965	1,497,224,900	136,131,380	1,652,140,570	1,819,717,540	65,879,366	0	5,171,093,756	674,861,943.00	
1966	2,188,147,783	156,208,283	1,382,734,540	821,101,500	108,984,932	0	4,657,177,038	427,733,186.98	
1967	3,048,667,100	107,325,800	2,244,007,320	1,524,031,848	295,046,978	0	7,219,079,046	788,785,144.00	
1968	4,852,420,571	191,623,884	905,218,680	322,265,500	246,951,930	0	6,518,480,565	352,669,607.91	
1969	5,684,117,200	322,882,500	709,113,870	290,584,000	129,881,800	0	7,136,579,370	281,483,584.00	
1970	5,480,313,904	754,317,384	1,100,512,100	553,761,364	2,150,000	0	7,891,054,752	342,085,559.24	
1971	5,355,669,059	423,028,800	540,604,240	367,918,428	457,261,424	116,386,424	7,260,868,375	565,765,297.59	(Note: In 1971, the Eisenhower design was used for $1 coins.)
1972	5,975,265,508	553,730,600	761,830,000	526,115,732	295,070,000	168,438,511	8,280,450,351	611,124,629.08	
1973	7,594,998,883	745,801,000	770,702,426	579,901,400	148,135,400	3,538,516	9,843,077,625	412,891,847.43	
1974	8,876,665,183	879,125,000	1,041,331,000	1,154,616,300	280,662,300	72,883,000	12,305,282,783	738,724,226.83	
1975	9,956,751,442	583,647,300	899,379,200	1,669,902,855	521,873,248	220,565,274	11,439,777,942	218,687,799.42	(Note: In 1975 and 1976 all 25¢, 50¢, and $1 coins were dated 1776-1976.)
1976	8,895,884,881	931,088,147	1,263,982,774	1,669,902,855	521,873,248	220,565,274	13,503,300,179	1,160,889,145.31	
1977	8,663,992,300	882,689,422	1,173,537,228	303,380,978	35,808,906	45,579,006	11,104,987,840	387,456,820.40	
1978	9,838,838,400	704,400,780	946,827,540	808,825,152	28,115,799	58,714,890	12,385,722,561	503,270,254.50	
1979	10,157,872,254	789,055,672	706,361,184	1,008,497,780	84,127,422	757,813,744	13,503,728,056	1,263,669,524.54	(Note: In 1979, the Susan B. Anthony design was used for $1 coins.)
1980	12,554,803,660	1,095,327,448	1,454,524,321	1,154,159,487	77,590,449	89,660,708	16,426,066,073	742,762,645.35	
1981	12,864,985,677	1,022,305,843	1,388,934,143	1,177,438,833	57,383,533	9,742,000	16,520,790,029	651,452,037.97	
1982	16,725,504,368	666,081,544	1,062,188,584	980,973,788	23,959,102	0	19,458,707,386	564,000,977.28	(Note: In 1982, both the bronze and copper-plated zinc planchets were used for 1¢ coins.)
1983	14,219,554,428	1,098,341,276	1,377,154,224	1,291,341,446	66,611,244	0	18,053,002,618	690,969,013.98	
1984	13,720,317,906	1,264,444,146	1,561,472,976	1,223,028,064	52,291,158	0	17,821,554,250	688,475,278.96	
1985	10,935,889,813	1,106,862,408	1,293,180,932	1,295,781,850	38,520,996	0	14,670,235,999	637,226,072.23	
1986	8,934,262,191	898,702,623	1,155,976,663	1,055,497,993	28,443,778	0	12,072,883,248	527,971,806.61	
1987	9,561,856,445	782,090,085	1,415,912,883	1,238,094,177	5,781,516	0	13,003,735,106	588,728,659.25	
1988	11,346,550,443	1,435,131,652	1,992,935,489	1,158,862,688	25,626,096	0	15,959,106,368	687,044,355.93	
1989	12,607,002,111	1,469,654,474	2,194,935,597	1,409,403,597	47,542,216	0	17,728,537,995	795,168,311.76	
1990	11,774,659,533	1,325,574,503	2,144,335,824	1,541,430,181	42,374,242	0	16,828,374,283	805,003,569.13	
1991	9,324,382,076	1,050,600,678	1,528,461,114	1,201,934,693	29,928,678	0	13,135,307,239	614,067,978.31	
1992	9,097,578,300	850,117,113	1,209,773,932	774,541,107	34,281,106	0	11,966,638,558	465,234,861.60	
1993	12,111,355,571	818,160,135	1,516,290,166	1,284,752,128	30,510,006	0	15,761,068,006	650,093,614.06	
1994	13,632,615,000	1,437,922,110	2,492,268,110	1,705,634,110	47,546,110	0	19,315,985,440	907,630,649.00	
1995	13,540,000,000	1,662,268,000	2,400,390,000	2,107,552,000	52,784,000	0	19,762,994,000	1,011,832,400.00	
1996	13,123,260,000	1,647,068,000	2,821,463,000	1,831,908,000	49,186,000	0	19,472,885,000	978,302,300.00	
1997	9,199,355,000	937,612,000	1,971,450,000	1,195,420,000	40,758,000	0	13,344,595,000	655,253,150.00	
1998	10,257,400,000	1,323,672,000	2,335,300,000	1,867,400,000	30,710,000	0	15,814,482,000	884,492,600.00	
1999	11,597,665,000	2,278,720,000	3,561,750,000	4,430,940,000	19,582,000	47,668,000	21,936,325,000	1,751,281,650.00	
2000	14,277,420,000	2,355,760,000	3,661,200,000	6,477,470,000	42,066,000	1,286,056,000	28,093,434,000	3,553,138,700.00	(Note: In 2000, the Sacagawea dollar was used for $1 coins.)
2001	10,334,590,000	1,303,384,000	2,782,390,000	4,806,984,000	40,704,000	133,407,500	19,401,459,500	1,802,259,600.00	
2002	7,288,855,000	1,230,480,000	2,567,000,000	3,313,704,000	5,600,000	7,597,610	14,413,236,610	1,229,936,160.00	
2003	6,848,000,000	824,880,000	2,072,000,000	2,280,400,000	5,000,000	6,160,000	12,036,440,000	895,684,000.00	
2004	6,836,000,000	1,445,040,000	2,487,500,000	2,401,600,000	5,800,000	5,320,000	13,181,260,000	997,982,000.00	
2005	7,700,050,500	1,741,200,000	2,835,500,000	3,013,600,000	7,300,000	5,040,000	15,302,690,500	1,209,700,505.00	
2006	8,234,000,000	1,502,400,000	2,828,000,000	2,941,000,000	4,400,000	7,700,000	15,517,500,000	1,185,410,000.00	
2007	7,401,200,000	1,197,840,000	2,089,500,000	2,796,640,000	4,800,000	950,670,000	14,440,650,000	1,995,084,000.00	
2008	5,419,200,000	640,560,000	1,050,500,000	2,538,800,000	3,400,000	489,120,000	10,141,580,000	1,316,790,000.00	
2009	2,354,000,000	86,640,000	146,000,000	533,920,000	3,800,000	423,640,000	3,548,000,000	601,492,000.00	
2010	4,010,830,000	490,560,000	1,119,000,000	347,000,000	3,500,000	402,220,000	6,373,110,000	667,256,300.00	
2011	4,938,540,000	990,240,000	1,502,000,000	391,200,000	3,450,000	374,920,000	8,200,350,000	723,542,400.00	
2012	6,015,200,000	1,023,600,000	1,676,000,000	568,010,000	3,500,000	49,920,000	9,336,230,000	472,604,500.00	
2013	7,070,000,000	1,223,040,000	2,112,000,000	1,455,200,000	9,600,000	37,100,000	11,906,940,000	748,752,000.00	
2014	8,146,400,000	1,206,240,000	2,302,500,000	1,580,200,000	4,600,000	41,020,000	13,280,960,000	810,396,000.00	
2015	9,365,300,000	1,599,600,000	3,041,010,000	2,990,820,000	4,600,000	45,370,000	17,046,700,000	1,273,109,000.00	
2016	9,118,400,000	1,546,560,000	2,954,000,000	2,356,030,000	4,200,000	38,220,000	16,017,410,000	1,093,239,500.00	
2017	8,634,020,000	1,373,280,000	2,728,000,000	2,116,000,000	4,700,000	3,360,000	14,859,360,000	962,514,200.00	
2018	7,478,200,000	1,204,560,000	2,126,000,000	1,742,314,000	10,200,000	3,500,000	12,564,774,000	791,788,500.00	
2019	7,040,400,000	1,094,894,400	2,194,000,000	1,651,600,000	3,400,000	2,940,000	11,987,234,400	762,088,720.00	
2020	7,596,400,000	1,623,100,000	2,778,500,000	2,768,000,000	5,700,000	2,660,000	14,774,400,000	1,132,479,000.00	
2021	7,908,620,000	1,570,780,000	2,830,250,000	2,632,600,000	13,100,000	2,520,000	14,957,870,000	1,107,870,200.00	
2022	6,359,600,000	1,547,520,000	3,134,000,000	2,567,600,000	9,700,000	1,960,000	13,620,380,000	1,103,082,000.00	
2023	4,522,800,000	1,427,500,000	2,705,500,000	2,665,600,000	58,000,000	2,240,000	11,381,640,000	1,084,793,000.00	
2024	3,225,200,000	112,800,000	555,000,000	1,680,800,000	37,600,000	2,240,000	5,613,640,000	534,632,000.00	
2025	1,300,400,000	1,041,200,000	1,375,500,000	1,191,000,000	34,000,000	5,180,000	4,947,280,000	522,544,000.00	
