= United States Seated Liberty coinage =

Designs on US silver coins

The Seated Liberty portrait designs appeared on most regular-issue silver United States coinage from 1836 through 1891. The denominations which featured the Goddess of Liberty in a Seated Liberty design included the half dime, the dime, the quarter, the half dollar, and until 1873 the silver dollar. Another coin that appeared exclusively in the Seated Liberty design was the twenty cent piece. This coin was produced from 1875 to 1878, and was discontinued because it looked very similar to the quarter. Seated Liberty coinage was minted at the main United States Mint in Philadelphia, as well as the branch mints in New Orleans, San Francisco, and Carson City.

== Background ==
Mint Director R. M. Patterson sought to change U.S. coinage as early as 1835 from using bust-style designs to something closer to British copper coinage of the era. Engraver William Kneass sketched the initial design, but was unable to complete the project due to a stroke. The design was drawn by Thomas Sully and Titian Peale, and the final engraved design was made by Mint engraver Christian Gobrecht.

== Basic design ==
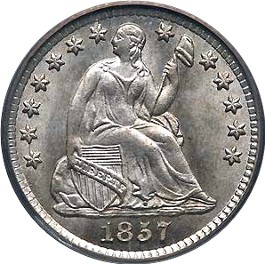
Obverse of a Seated Liberty Half Dime, dated 1857.

=== Obverse ===
The basic obverse design of the Seated Liberty coinage consisted of the figure of Liberty clad in a flowing dress and seated upon a rock. In her left hand, she holds a Liberty pole surmounted by a Phrygian cap, which had been a pre-eminent symbol of freedom during the movement of Neoclassicism (and traces its roots back to Ancient Greece and Rome). Although it had fallen out of favor in Europe by 1830, Neoclassicism remained in vogue in the United States until after the American Civil War. Liberty's right hand rested on the top corner of a striped shield with a diagonal banner inscribed with the word "Liberty". The shield represented preparedness in the defense of freedom. The date of the coin appeared on the bottom below Liberty.

=== Reverse ===
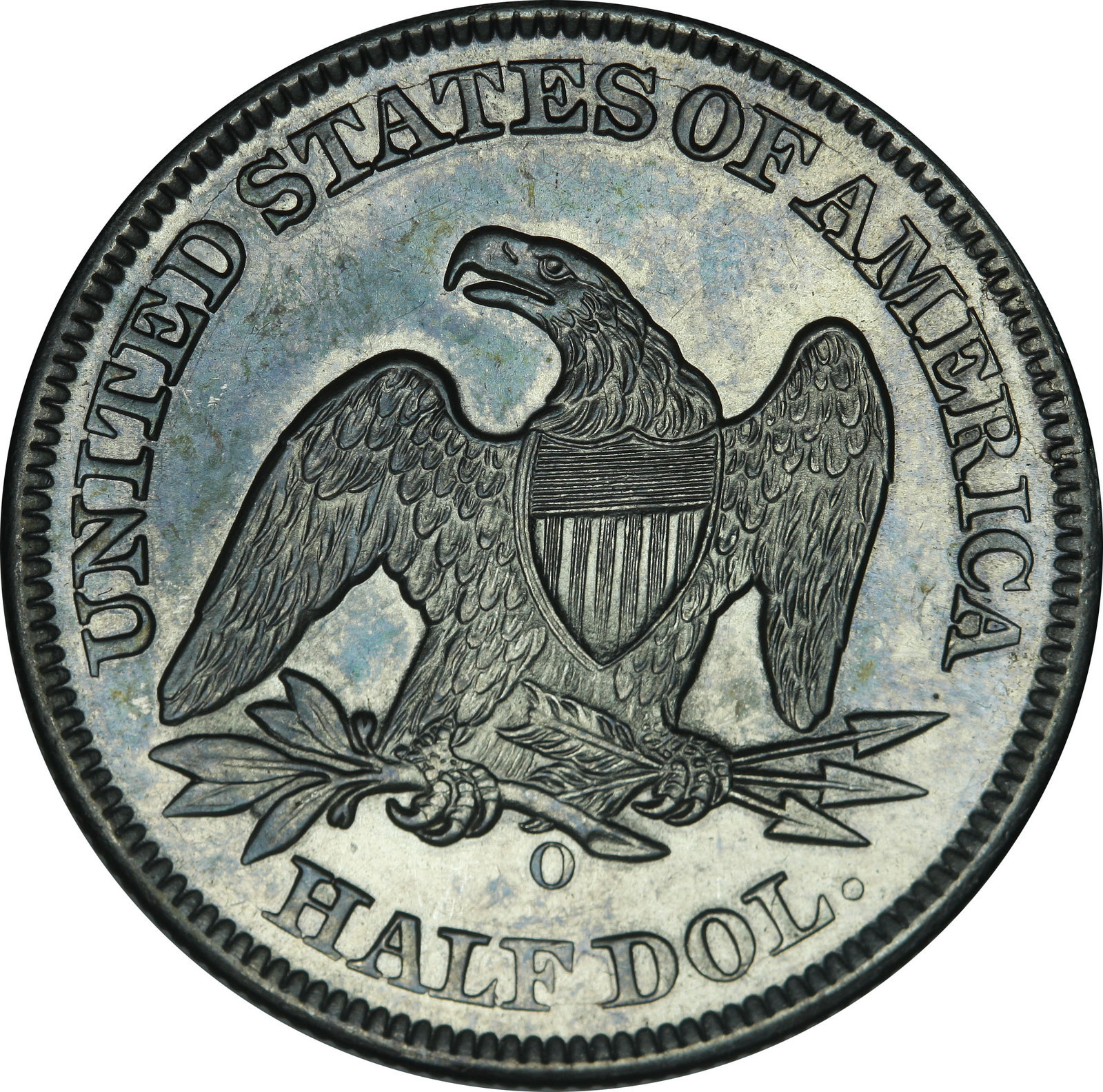
Reverse of the Seated Liberty Half Dollar.

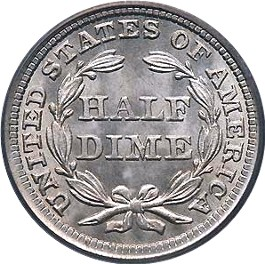
Reverse of the Seated Liberty Half Dime.

The basic reverse design of Seated Liberty coins depended on the denomination. The size of half dimes and dimes necessitated a smaller array of elements. On these coins, the reverse consistently featured a wreath around the words "half dime" or "one dime". Before 1860, this wreath consisted of laurel leaves, a traditional Neoclassical image, but beginning that year, the wreath was enlarged and was filled not only with leaves, but also traditional American agricultural products, such as corn and wheat.

On quarter, half dollar, and silver dollar coins, the reverse featured a central eagle about to take flight, with a striped shield upon its breast. The eagle clutched an olive branch of peace in its right talons and a group of arrows in its left talons. Above the eagle around the rim were the words "United States of America" and below the eagle around the rim lay the coin denomination. The design was a version of a John Reich eagle which was originally designed in 1807 for Capped Bust coinage, and redrawn by Gobrecht. Beginning in 1866, the coins featured a ribbon with the motto "In God We Trust" above the eagle.

== Modifications ==
=== Stars ===
When the first Seated Liberty half dimes and dimes appeared in 1837, the obverse contained no stars. There are two varieties; the large date and the small date. For the dime, these two types can be distinguished by noting the "3" and the "7" in the date. In the large date variety, the "3" has a pointed serif at top, and the horizontal element of the "7" is straight. In the small date variety, the "3" has a rounded serif, and there is small a knob, or bulge, in the "7" horizontal element. Only the Philadelphia Mint made both varieties. The small date is slightly rarer. The New Orleans Mint made only one variety. For the half dime, the small date can be distinguished by the fact that it is slightly bent in a "smile" orientation, similar to the Bust type of half dime. The large date can be distinguished by the fact that the date is more in a straight line, similar to dates of later years for the Seated Liberty. Only the Philadelphia Mint made half dimes in this year.

The Liberty Seated dime of 1838 minted in New Orleans was the first U.S. coin struck at a branch mint.

The next year, the coins featured thirteen six-pointed stars around the rim, commemorating the original Thirteen Colonies.

=== Drapery ===
The Seated Liberty coins featured a few minor design changes over the years. Around 1840 (the exact date depends upon the denomination), extra drapery was added to Liberty's left elbow.

=== Arrows and rays ===
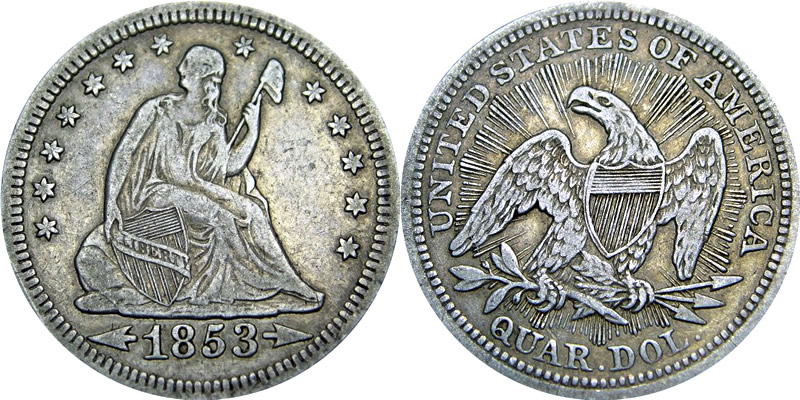
Liberty Seated quarter with arrows and rays.

In 1853 and 1873, the U.S. Mint changed the weight of each denomination of silver coins. Both times, arrows were added to the coins on each side of the date. These were removed from coins in 1856 and 1875, respectively. In 1853, the mint also placed rays around the eagle on the reverse of half dollars and quarters, a feature which endured for that one year only.

=== Legend and mintmarks ===
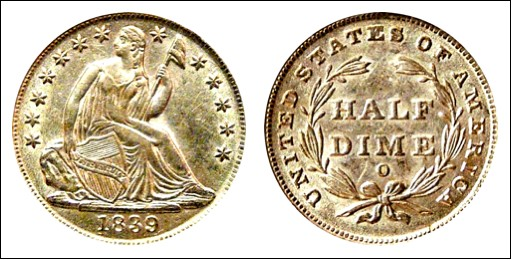
1839-O Seated Liberty half dime with New Orleans mintmark.

In 1860 the U.S. Mint eliminated the stars on the obverse of Seated Liberty half dimes and dimes, replacing them with the legend "United States of America", which had previously appeared around the wreath on the reverse of the coins. Before this time, half dimes and dimes minted in New Orleans and San Francisco had featured their mintmarks inside the wreaths. Afterwards, the "O" and "S" (and, later, the "CC" for Carson City) mintmarks were located below the wreath next to the rim. On quarters, half dollars, and silver dollars, the mintmarks were always placed below the eagle but above the coin currency on the reverse.

=== Varieties ===
Many people collect Seated coinage by variety. This can range from a repunched mintmark to the position of a date on the coin to a die crack at various stages. This type of collecting has been popular with Bust half dollars for well over 100 years. Seated coin collecting by variety has grown over the last 30 years with the formation of the Liberty Seated Collectors Club.

=== End of coinage ===
The Seated Liberty design remained standard on all American coins ranging from half dimes to half dollars for decades, but by 1879—the year after the Bland-Allison Act caused a drastic curtailment in the mintages of Seated Liberty half dollars, quarters, and even dimes until 1883, there was increased criticism and calls for its replacement, partially due to changing artistic tastes. Wendell Phillips admonished college students to "sit not, like the figure on our silver coin, ever looking backward." This led to the new "Barber Head" design, approved by President Harrison in 1891 and which began minting a year later, although it too would soon be criticized for "blandness," leading to the Barber coinage's replacement by the Mercury dime, the Standing Liberty quarter, and the Walking Liberty half dollar, all making their debut in 1916 (the Mercury dime included the motto "In God We Trust," making that motto's placement on U.S. coins universal, as the motto was not on the Barber dime, due to space limitations).

Preceded by Capped Bust coinage	United States coinage (1838–1891)	Succeeded by Barber coinage
