= Half dime =

Former United States five-cent silver coin

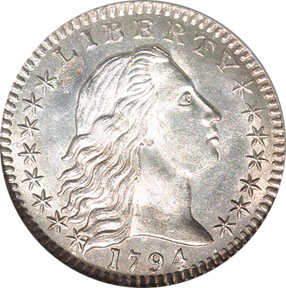
The 1794 "Flowing Hair" half dime, obverse

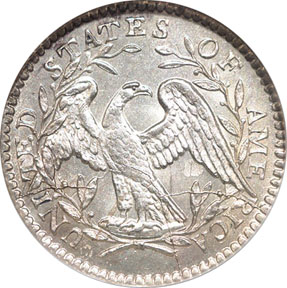
The 1794 "Flowing Hair" half dime, reverse

The half dime, or half disme (/ˈdaɪm/ DYM or /ˈdiːm/ DEEM), was a silver coin, valued at five cents, formerly minted in the United States.

Some numismatists consider the denomination to be the first business strike coin minted by the United States Mint under the Coinage Act of 1792, with production beginning on or about July 1792. However, others consider the 1792 half disme to be nothing more than a pattern coin, or "test piece", and this matter continues to be subject to debate.

These coins were much smaller than dimes in diameter and thickness, appearing to be "half dimes". In the 1860s, powerful interests promoting the use of nickel as a metal for use in coinage successfully lobbied for the creation of new three and five cent coins, which would be made of a copper-nickel alloy; production of such coins began in 1865 and 1866, respectively. The introduction of the copper-nickel three and five-cent pieces made the silver coins of the same denomination redundant, and both silver denominations were discontinued in 1873.

The following types of half dimes were produced by the US Mint or under the authority of the Coinage Act of 1792:

== Half Dime (1792) ==
The half disme was one of the first coins to be produced by the newly created US Mint. At least 1,500 half dismes struck in 1792, which would technically make them the first business strike coin to be minted by the Mint. However, its status as such is disputed, with the Mint recognizing the 1793 Chain cent as such.

Most Americans, not sure how to pronounce the French word "disme", referred to the coin as "dime". By the time production of half dismes resumed in 1794, the "s" had been dropped.

== Flowing Hair (1794–1795) ==
The Flowing Hair half dime was designed by Robert Scot and this same design was also used for half dollar and dollar silver coins minted during the same period. The obverse bears a Liberty portrait similar to that appearing on the 1794 half cent and cent but without the liberty cap and pole. Mintage of the 1794 version was 7,765 while 78,660 of the 1795 version were produced.

== Draped Bust (1796–1805) ==
=== Small eagle reverse (1796–1797) ===
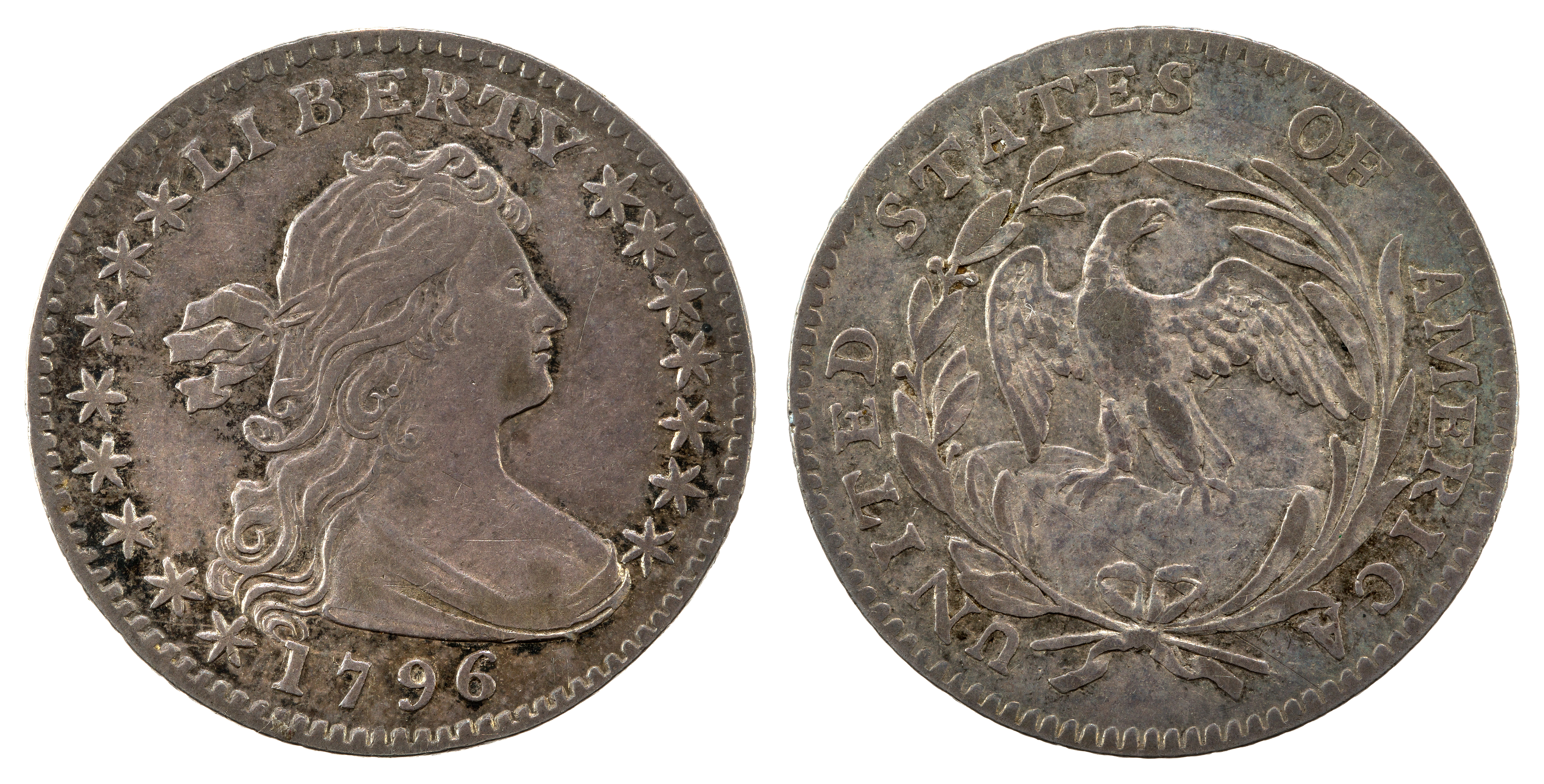
1796 Draped Bust half dime with small eagle reverse

The obverse of the Draped Bust half dime was based on a sketch by artist Gilbert Stuart, with the dies engraved by Robert Scot and John Eckstein. The primary 1796 variety bears fifteen stars representing the then number of states in the union. In 1797, fifteen and sixteen star varieties were produced – the sixteenth star representing newly admitted Tennessee – as well as a thirteen star variety after the mint realized that it could not continue to add more stars as additional states joined the union. The reverse bears an open wreath surrounding a small eagle perched on a cloud. 54,757 half dimes of this design were minted.

=== Heraldic eagle reverse (1800–1805) ===
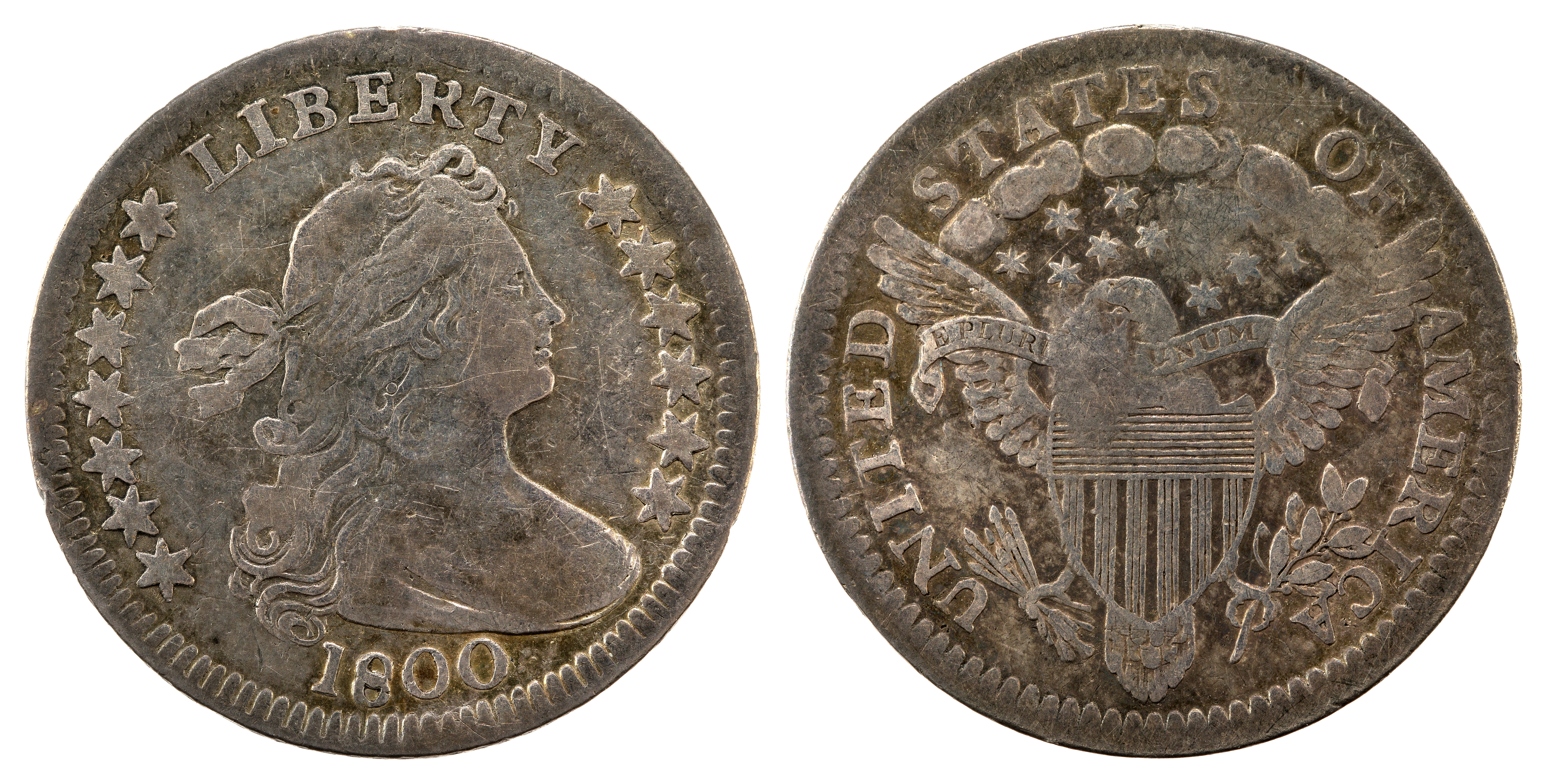
1800 Draped Bust half dime with heraldic eagle reverse

Following a two-year hiatus, mintage of half dimes resumed in 1800. The obverse remained essentially the same as the prior version, but the reverse was revised substantially. The eagle on the reverse now had outstretched wings, heraldic style. This reverse design first appeared on gold quarter and half eagles and then dimes and dollars in the 1790s. Mintage of the series never surpassed 40,000, with none produced in 1804. No denomination or mintmark appears on the coins; all were minted in Philadelphia.

== Capped Bust (1829–1837) ==
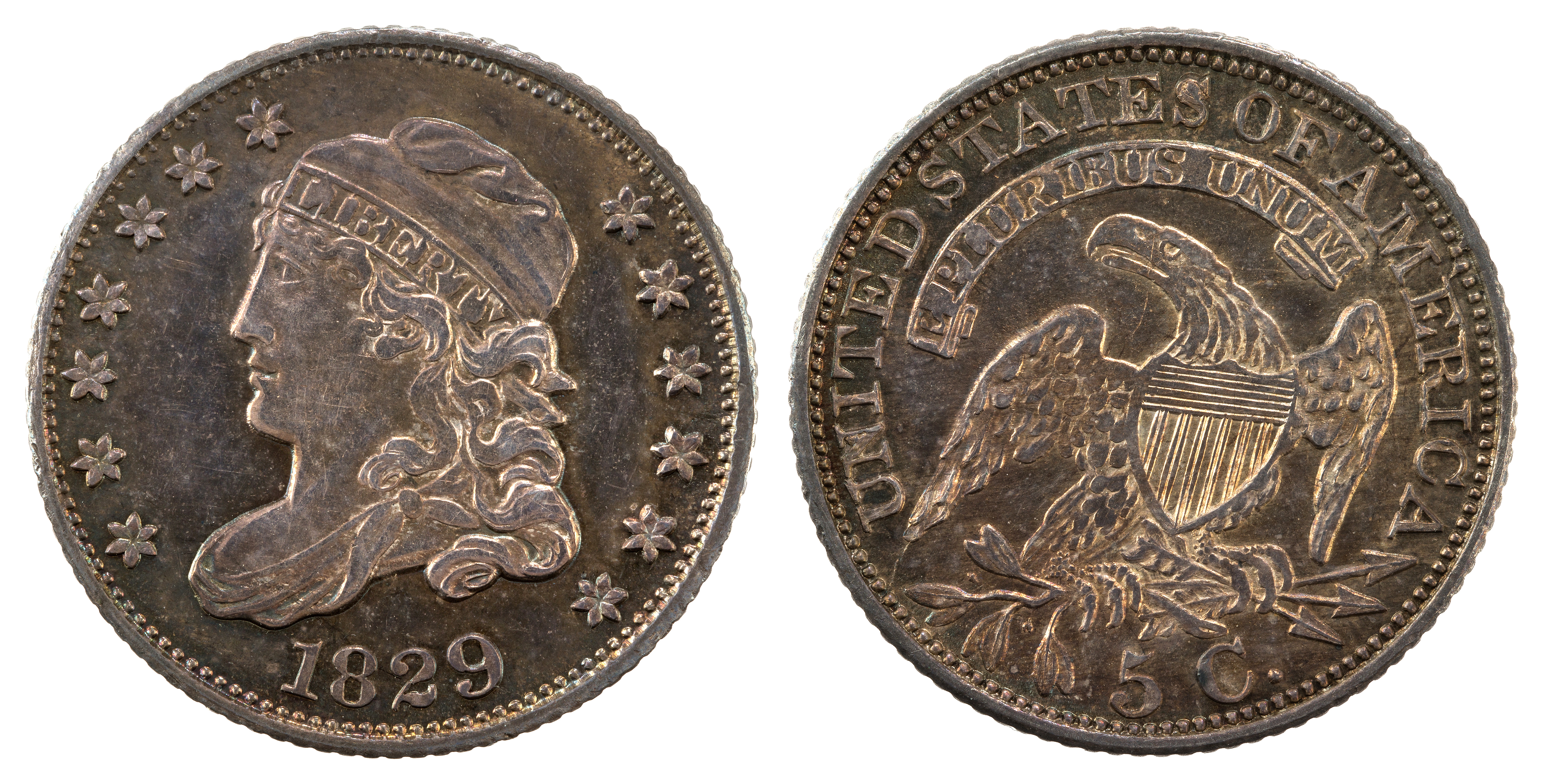
1829 Capped Bust half dime

Production of half dimes resumed in 1829 based on a new design by Chief Engraver William Kneass, who is believed to have adapted an earlier John Reich design. All coins were minted at Philadelphia and display no mintmark. The high circulating mintage in the series was in 1835, when 2,760,000 were struck, and the low of 871,000 was in 1837. Both Capped Bust and Seated Liberty half dimes were minted in 1837.

== Seated Liberty (1837–1873) ==
Seated Liberty Half Dime varieties
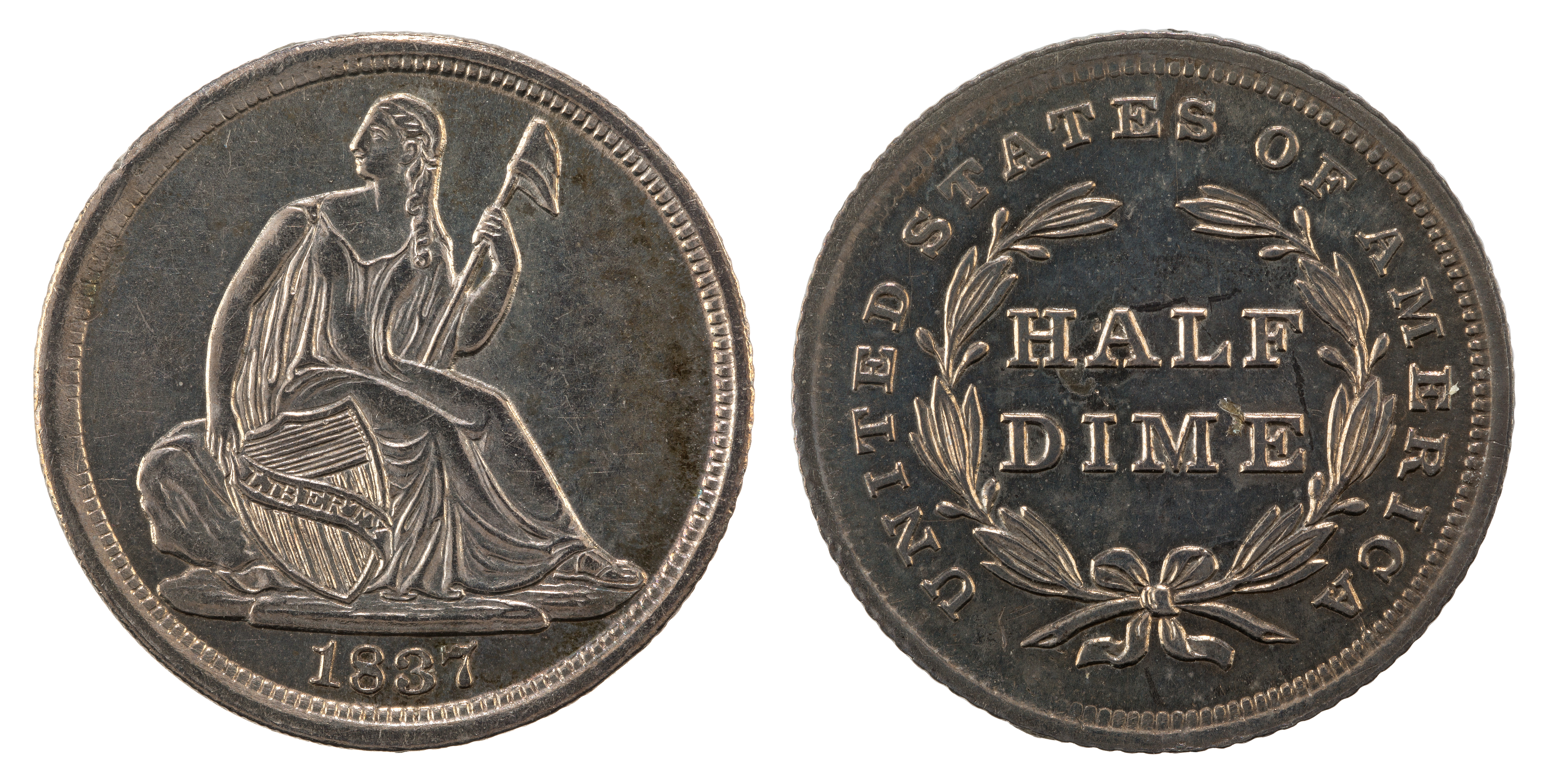
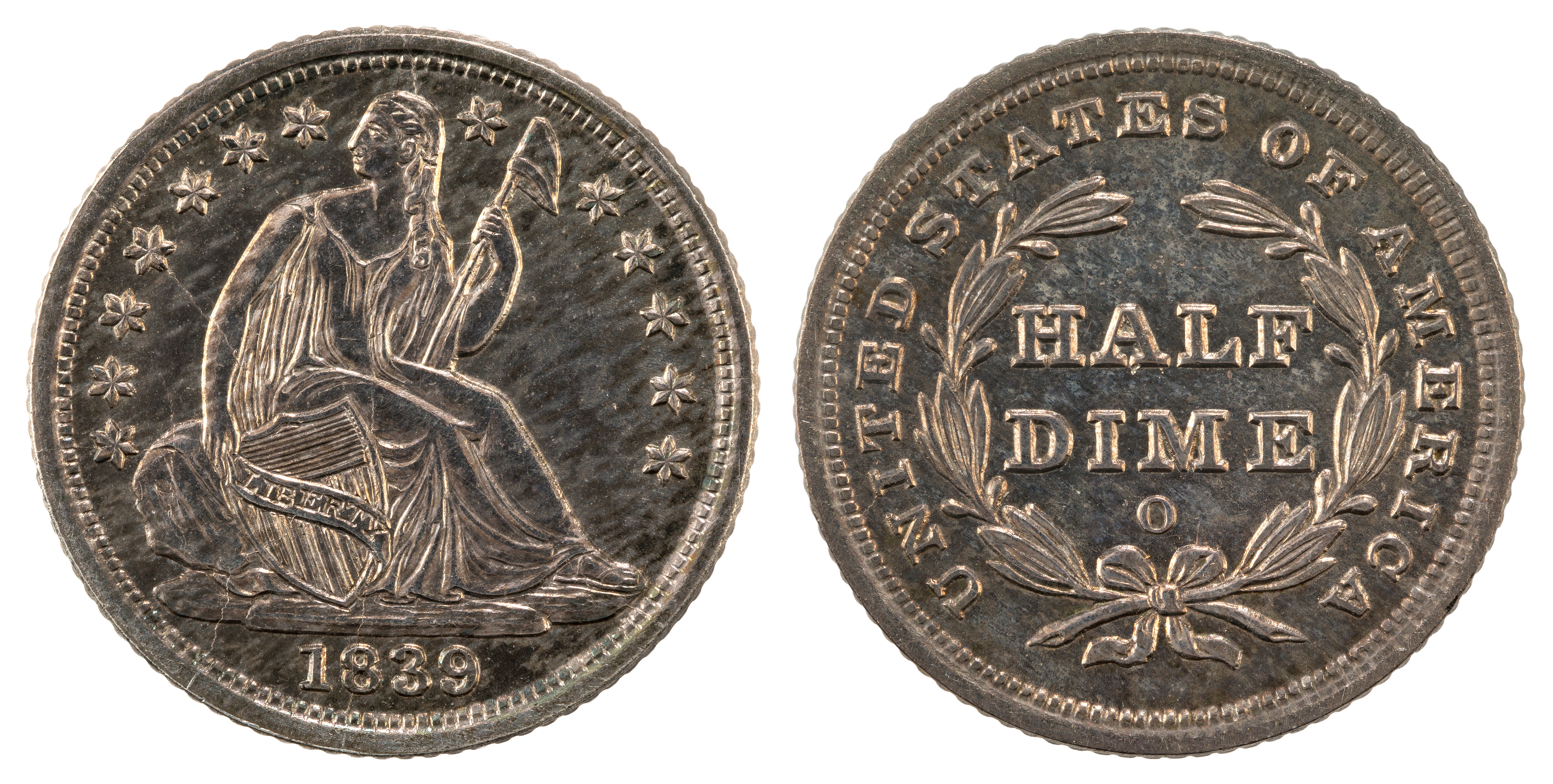
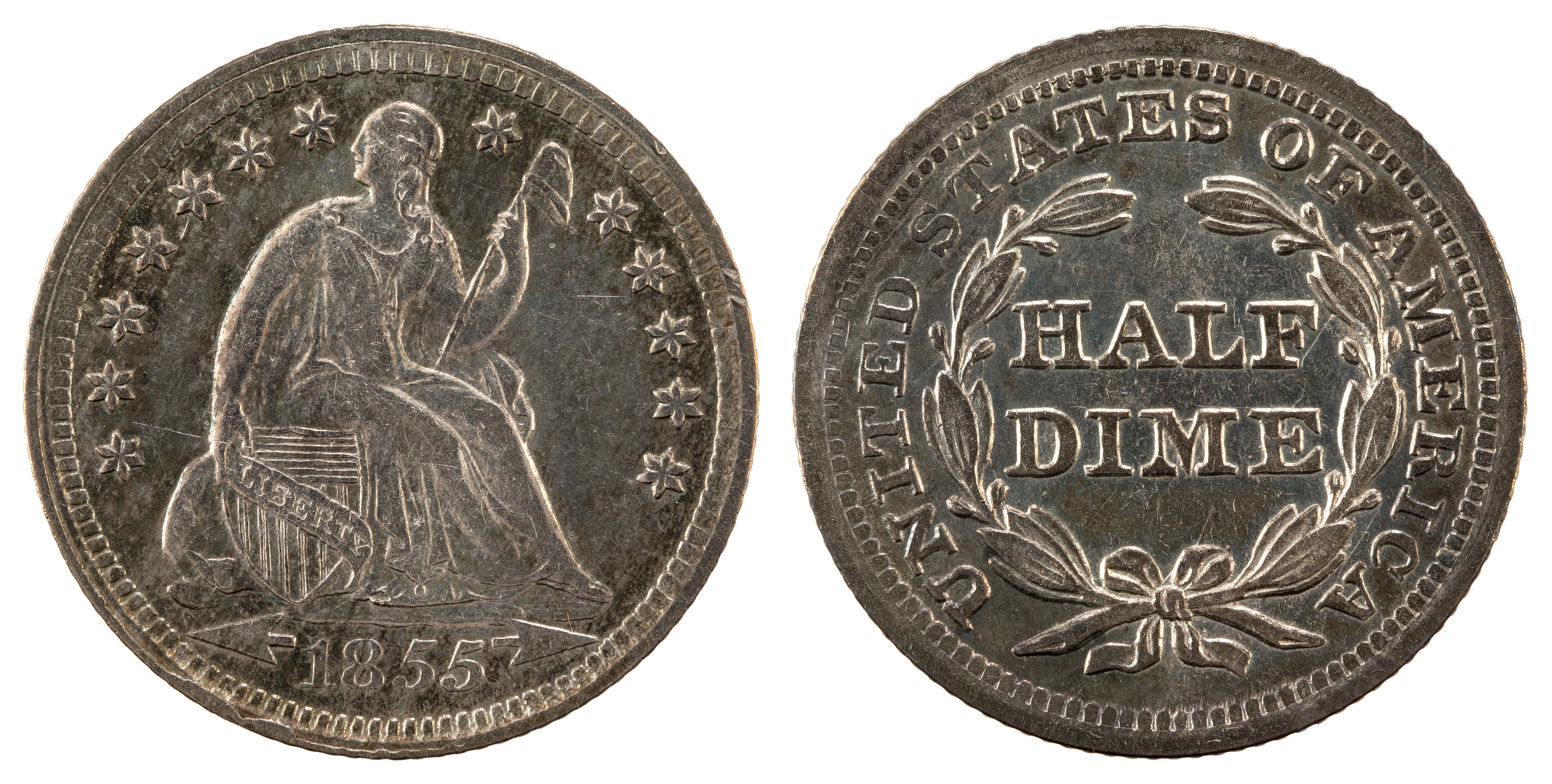
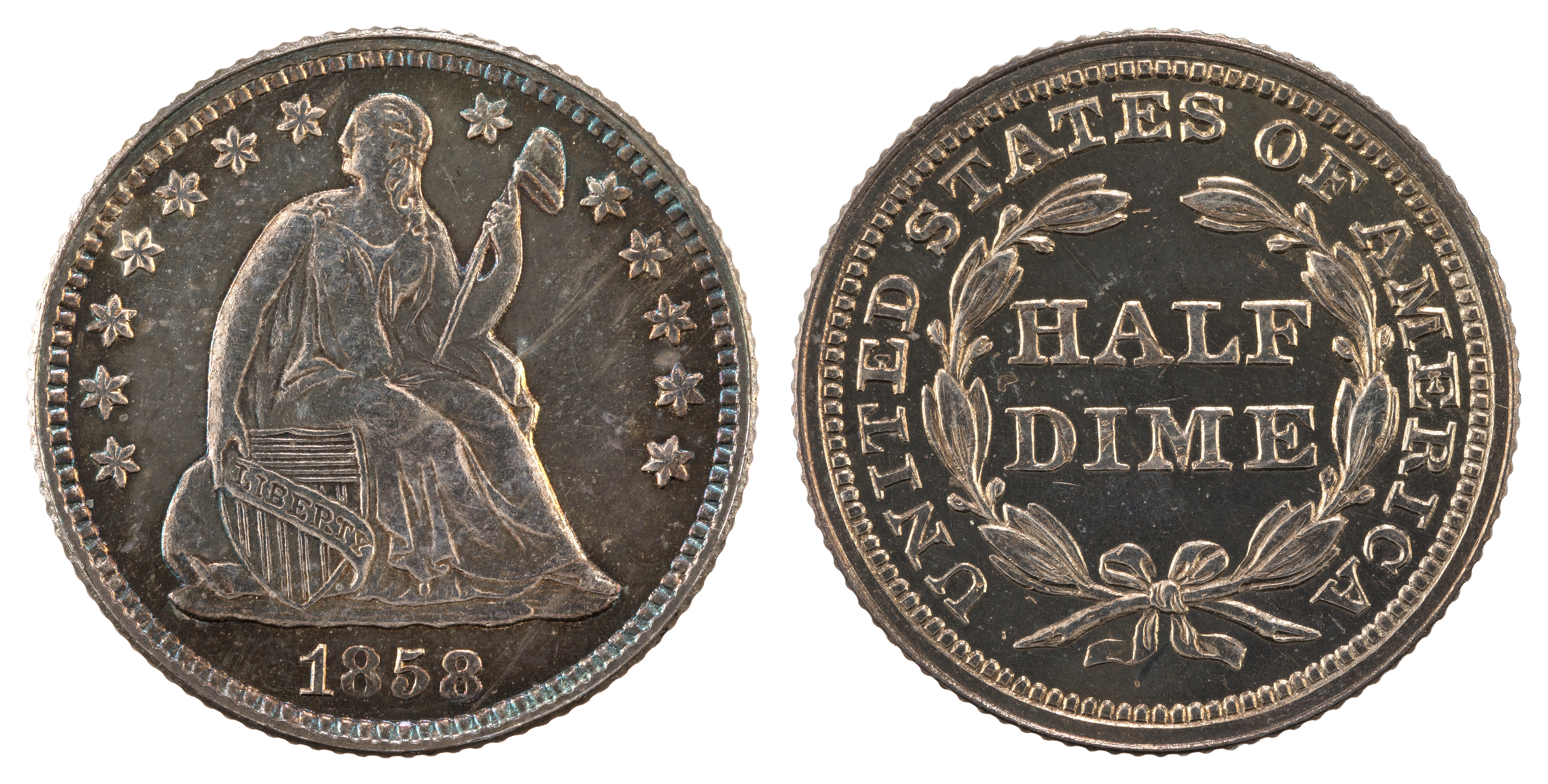
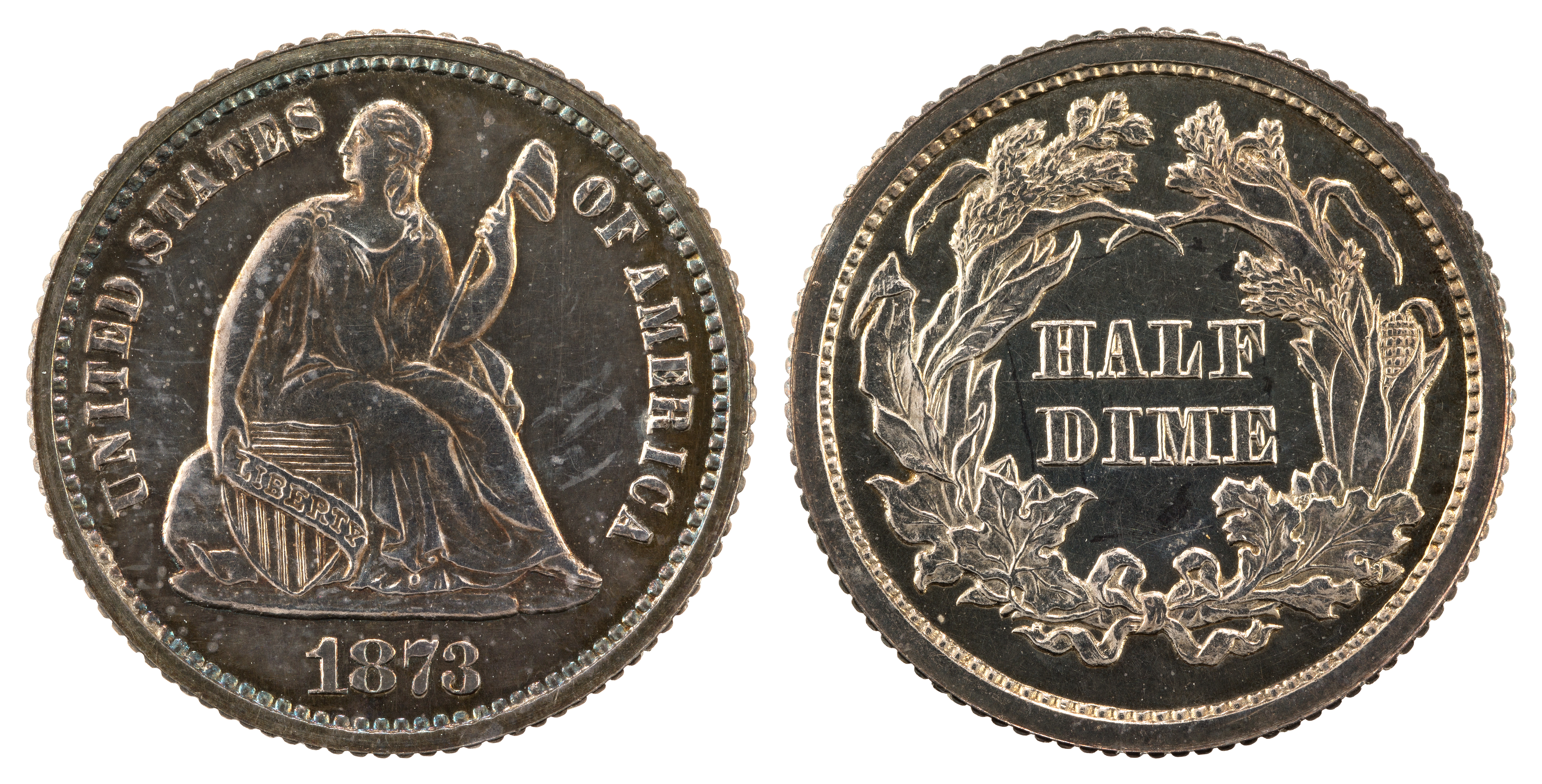
Top down: 1837 (no stars), 1839 (no drapery), 1855 (arrows), 1858 (stars), 1873 (legend)

These were the last silver half dimes produced. The design features Liberty seated on a rock and holding a shield and was first conceived in 1835 used first on the silver dollar patterns of 1836. The series is divided into several subtypes. The first was struck at Philadelphia in 1837 and New Orleans in 1838 and lacks stars on the obverse. In 1838 a semicircle of 13 stars was added around the obverse border, and this basic design was used through 1859. In 1853, small arrows were added to each side of the date to reflect a reduction in weight due to rising silver prices, and the arrows remained in place through 1855. The arrows were dropped in 1856, with the earlier design resumed through 1859. In 1860, the obverse stars were replaced with the inscription UNITED STATES OF AMERICA and the reverse wreath was enlarged. This design stayed in place through the end of the series. The Seated Liberty half dime was produced at the Philadelphia, San Francisco and New Orleans mints in an aggregate amount of 84,828,478 coins struck for circulation. See also United States Seated Liberty coinage.

=== 1870-S half dime ===
In 1978 a coin collector surprised the coin collecting community with an 1870–S (San Francisco) half dime, believed to have been found in a dealer's box of cheap coins at a coin show. According to mint records for 1870, no half dimes had been minted in San Francisco; yet it was a genuine 1870-S half dime. At an auction later that same year, the 1870-S half dime sold for $425,000. It is believed that another example may exist—along with other denominations minted that year in San Francisco—in the cornerstone of the old San Francisco Mint. Later in July, 2004, the discovery coin sold for $661,250 in MS-63 in a Stack's-Bowers auction.

== See also ==
- Nickel (United States coin)
- Dime (United States coin)

Preceded by Denomination Created	Five Cent Coin of the United States; 1792–1873	Succeeded by Nickel
