= Capped Bust =

Former design used on United States coinage

Denominational set of the Capped Bust

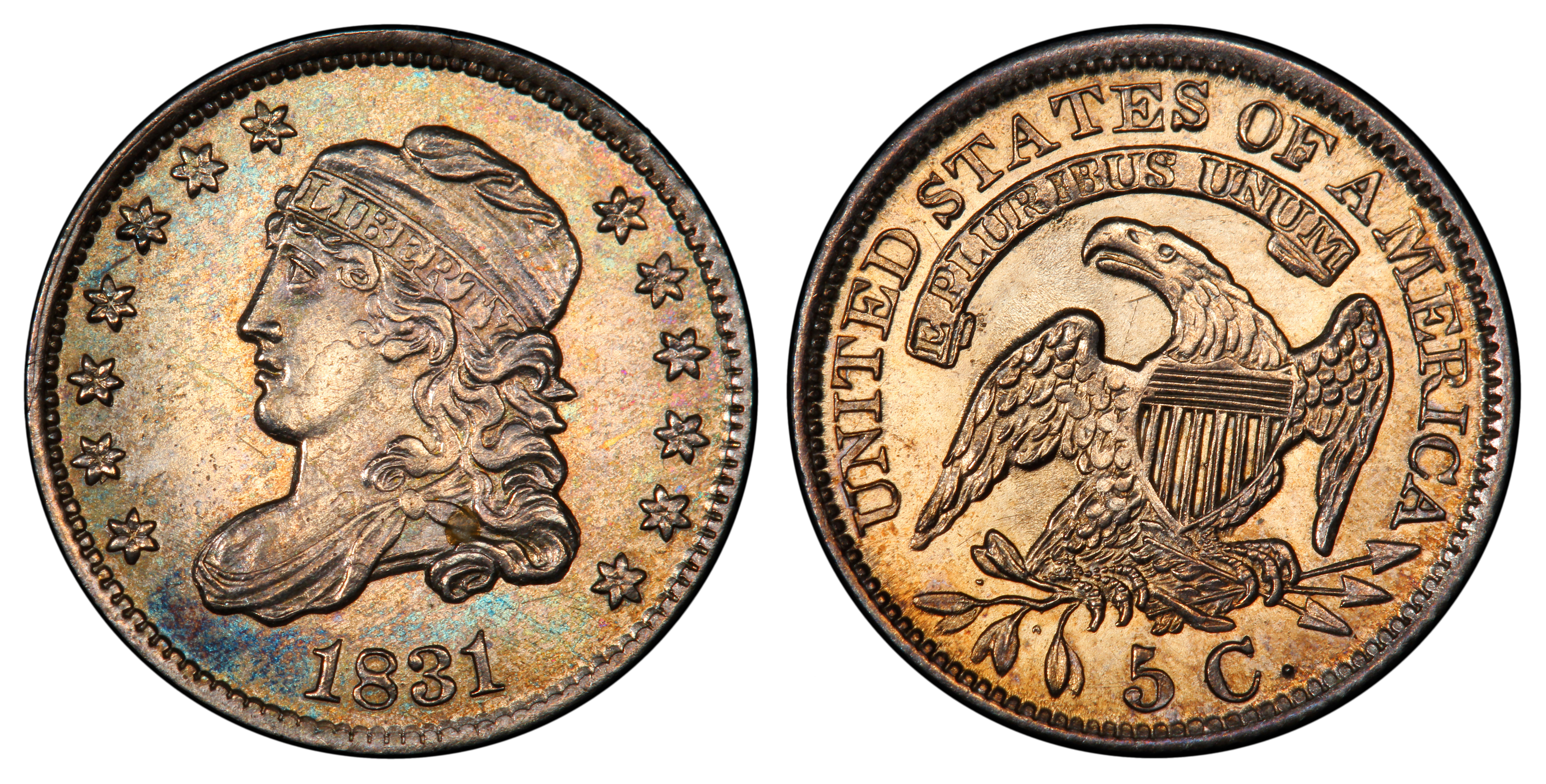
1831 five-cent

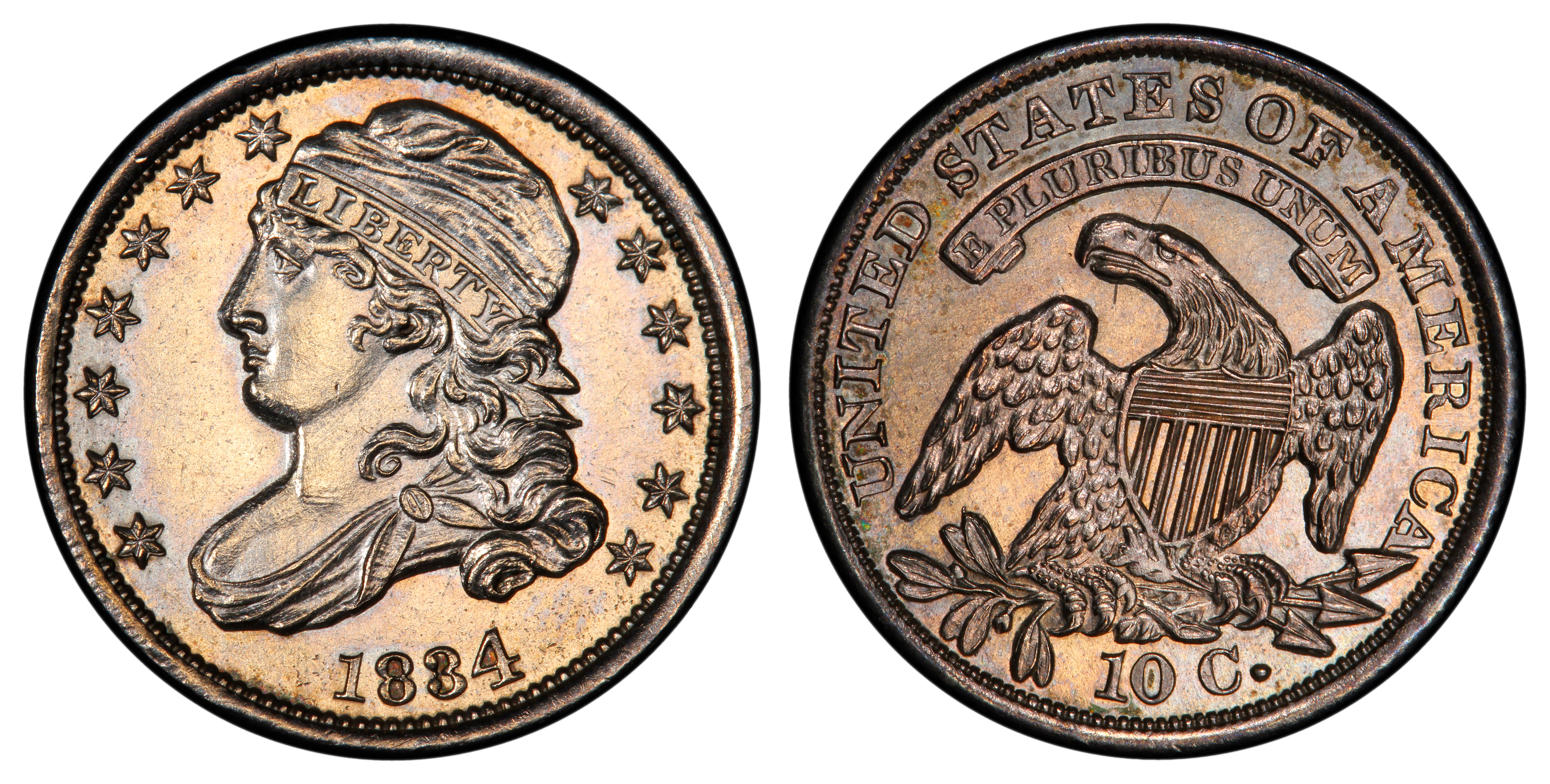
1834 10-cent

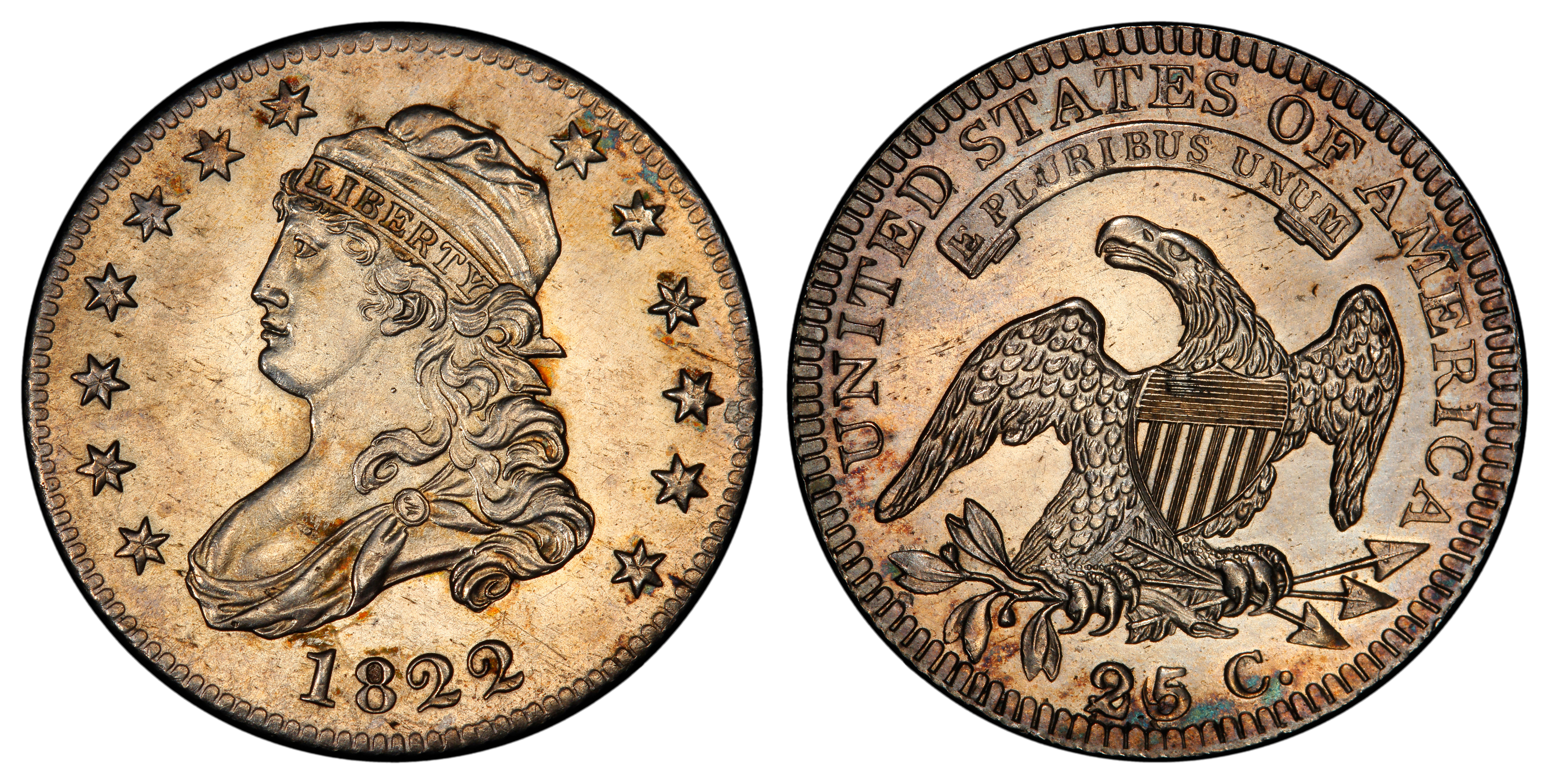
1822 25-cent

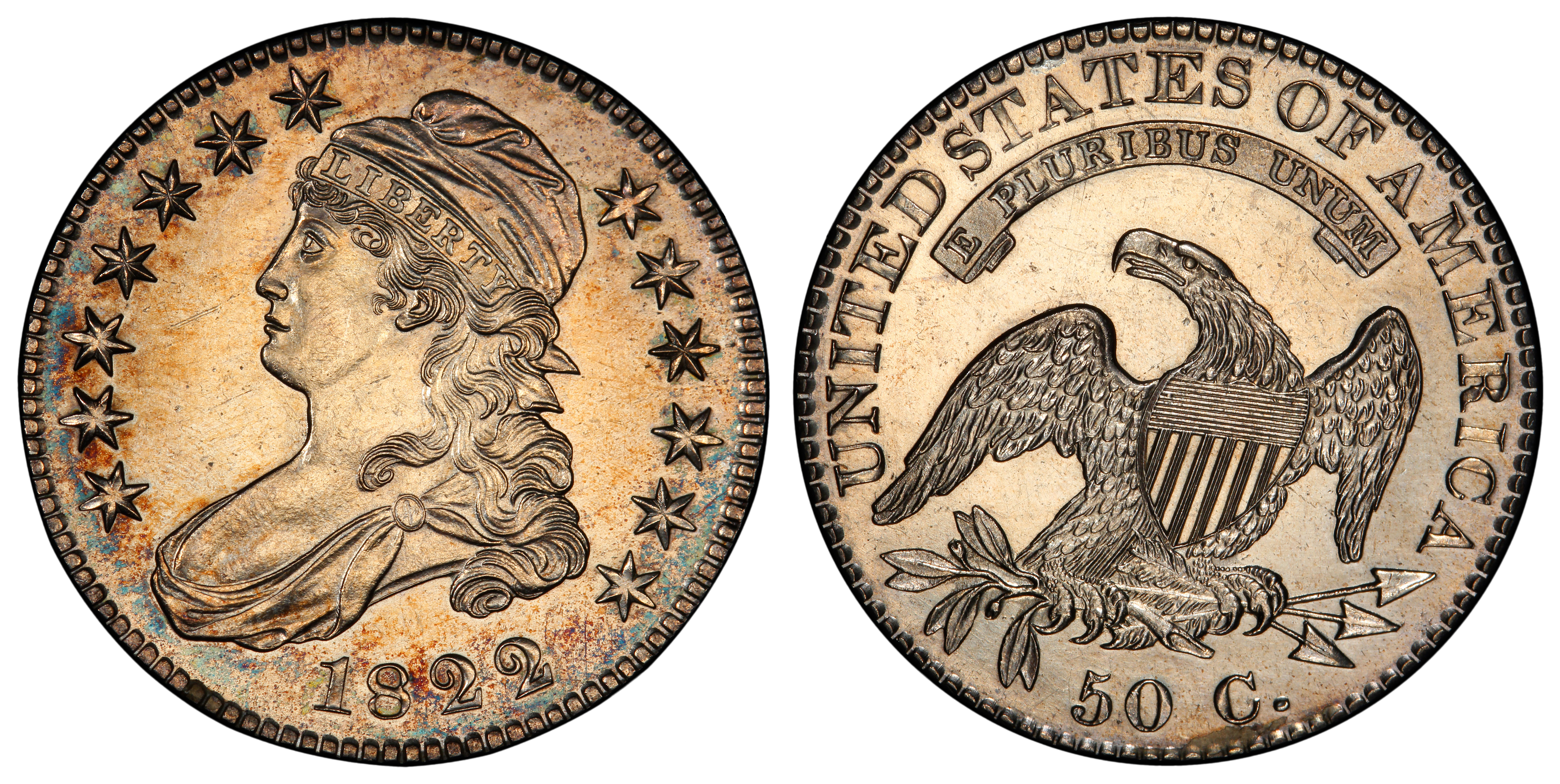
1822 50-cent

The Capped Bust coinage of the United States consisted of a half dime, dime, quarter and half dollar.

== History ==
John Reich designed this capped-head concept of Liberty, and it was modified by Chief Engraver of the Mint, William Kneass. It proved to be a popular design and lasted from 1807 to 1839 on the half dollar, 1815 to 1838 on the quarter, 1809 to 1837 on the dime, and 1829 to 1837 on the half dime. All four of these coins were struck in 89.2% silver and 10.8% copper.

There was also a gold design created by engraver Robert Scot created in 1795, also called the Capped Bust, although it is more popularly known as the "Turban Head" because of its unusual, exotic appearance. The Turban design was used on the gold Quarter Eagle, Half Eagle, and Eagle from 1795 to 1834. On the Quarter and Half Eagles, the Turban design was replaced with the regular Capped Bust design in 1808 and 1807, respectively, while the Eagle, having been out of production since 1804, adopted the "Coronet" Liberty Head design in 1838.

The obverse of the 2008 Andrew Jackson's Liberty First Spouse coin and medal features the Capped Bust design.
