= Eckfeldt =

Eckfeldt is a surname. Notable people with the surname include:

- Adam Eckfeldt (1769–1852), U.S. Mint worker and official
- Jacob R. Eckfeldt (1803–1872), American assayer

== See also ==
- Ekfeldt
