= Ekfeldt =

Ekfeldt is a Swedish surname. Notable people with the surname include:

- Jonas Ekfeldt (born 1971), Swedish music producer and singer
- Tage Ekfeldt (1926–2005), Swedish Olympic runner

== See also ==
- Eckfeldt
