= Adam Eckfeldt =

Second chief coiner of the United States Mint (1769–1852)

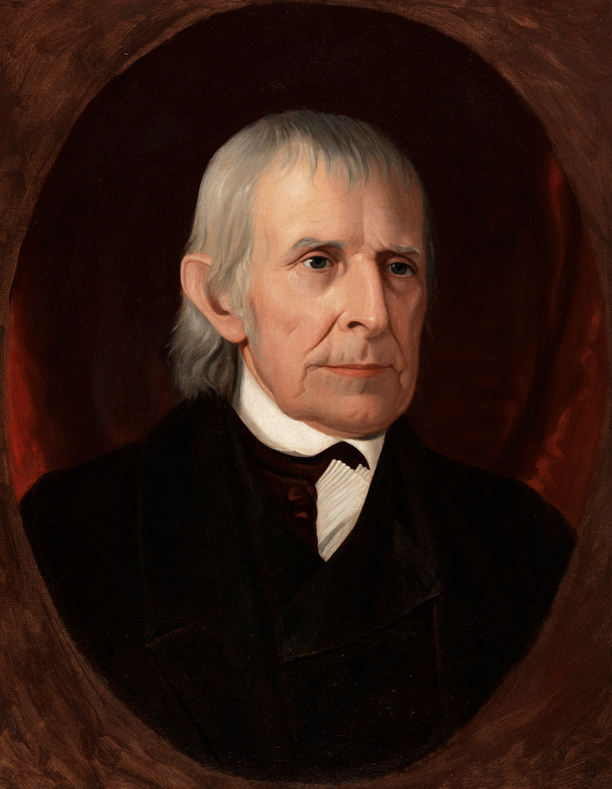
- Portrait c. 1845

2nd Chief Coiner of the United States Mint at Philadelphia
- In office February 15, 1814 – March 15, 1839
- President: James Madison; James Monroe; John Quincy Adams; Andrew Jackson; Martin Van Buren
- Preceded by: Henry Voigt
- Succeeded by: Franklin Peale

Personal details
- Born: John Adam Eckfeldt; June 15, 1769 Philadelphia, Province of Pennsylvania, British America
- Died: February 6, 1852 (aged 82) Philadelphia, Pennsylvania, U.S.
- Spouses: Maria Hahn (died); Margaretta Baush
- Children: Sarah (all children by Margaretta); Jacob R.; Anna Mary M.; Elias B.; Susannah; Adam C.; Margaretta

John Adam Eckfeldt (June 15, 1769 – February 6, 1852) was an American worker and official during the first years of the United States Mint. A lifelong Philadelphian, Eckfeldt served as the second chief coiner of the Mint, from 1814 until 1839.

Eckfeldt's father owned a large smithy and involved himself in early attempts at American coinage. Adam Eckfeldt built early presses for the Mint, engraved some of its early dies, and was responsible for the designs of early American copper coinage, as well as the 1792 half disme which some authorities consider the first United States coin. He was appointed assistant coiner of the Mint in 1796, and became chief coiner on his predecessor's death in 1814.

Eckfeldt served a quarter century as chief coiner, during which time the Philadelphia Mint moved to new premises. As he set aside unusual coins brought in as bullion, he started the Mint's coin cabinet, which evolved into the National Numismatic Collection. Even after his 1839 retirement, Eckfeldt continued to perform the duties of chief coiner; his death in 1852 caused his replacement, Franklin Peale, to seek an assistant.

== Early life ==
John Adam Eckfeldt was born in Philadelphia on June 15, 1769, the son of John Jacob Eckfeldt, a large-scale manufacturer of edge-tools and implements. At the time, it was common for those of German descent to bear the first name "John" but be referred to by middle name. The elder Eckfeldt and his wife Maria Magdalena had immigrated from Nuremberg, Bavaria, around 1764. John Jacob Eckfeldt, in his large smithy, made dies for the 1783 coinage under the Articles of Confederation authorized by Philadelphia financier Robert Morris. Adam was his father's apprentice, and became skilled in iron work and machinery.

== Coin designer and Mint official ==
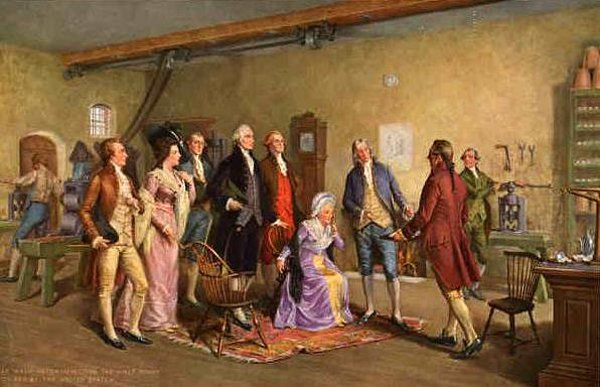
Inspecting the First Coins by John Dunsmore. Eckfeldt is dressed in blue, just to the right of the seated Martha Washington.

During Eckfeldt's childhood, the thirteen British colonies along the Atlantic coast of what is now the United States revolted, and so the United States of America secured its independence. After the United States Constitution was ratified, Congress and many government offices came to be housed in Philadelphia, including the newborn Mint of the United States. Adam Eckfeldt built the first screw press for the new facility in 1792, the same year that the Mint Act of 1792 was passed by Congress authorizing a mint, and cut the obverse die for the experimental Birch cent of that year. He also built other machinery for the Mint, and helped superintend the early coining.

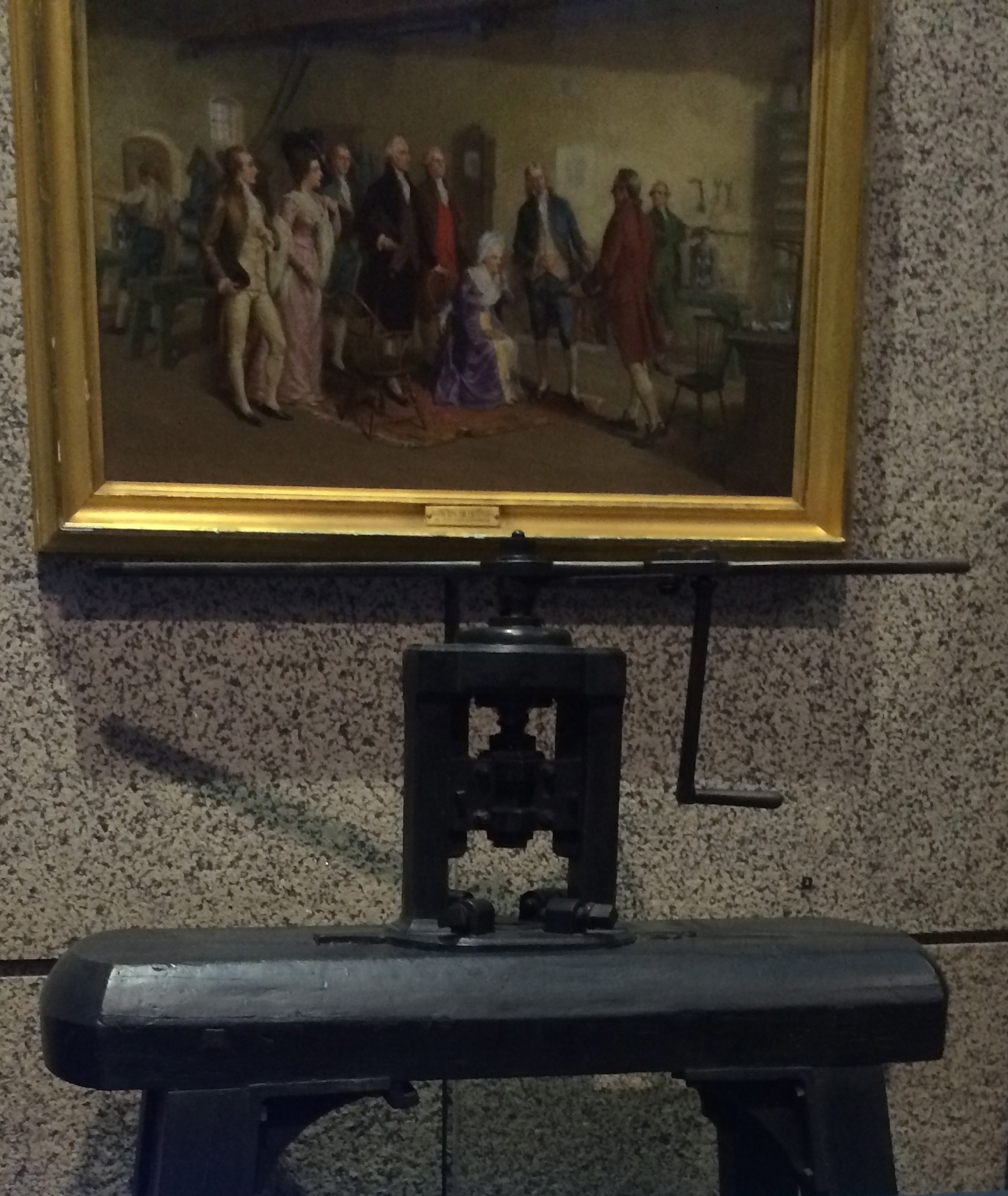
Eckfeldt's 1792 press, displayed beneath the Dunsmore painting depicting him

In 1792, the Mint acquired three balances from Eckfeldt, who also lent the Mint his lathe (used for turning dies). Eckfeldt is believed to have made the die from which the 1792 half disme, considered by some the first official U.S. coin, was struck—in 1829, a visitor to the Mint met Eckfeldt and later described him as "an artist [who] made the first die used in it". Other later accounts document Eckfeldt's role in this striking: an 1863 auction sold a half disme supposedly given by Eckfeldt to demonstrate his work. Eckfeldt is given as the source for the tradition that the half dismes were struck at the request of President George Washington to be used as presents. Eckfeldt operated his screw press to strike these roughly 1,500 pieces on July 13, 1792. Since the first Philadelphia Mint was still under construction at the time, these coins were produced in the cellar of John Harper, saw maker, at Sixth and Cherry Streets in Philadelphia. In his annual message to Congress late that year, Washington noted the ongoing construction of a mint building and stated: "There has also been a small beginning in the coinage of half dismes, the want of small coins in circulation calling the first attention to them."

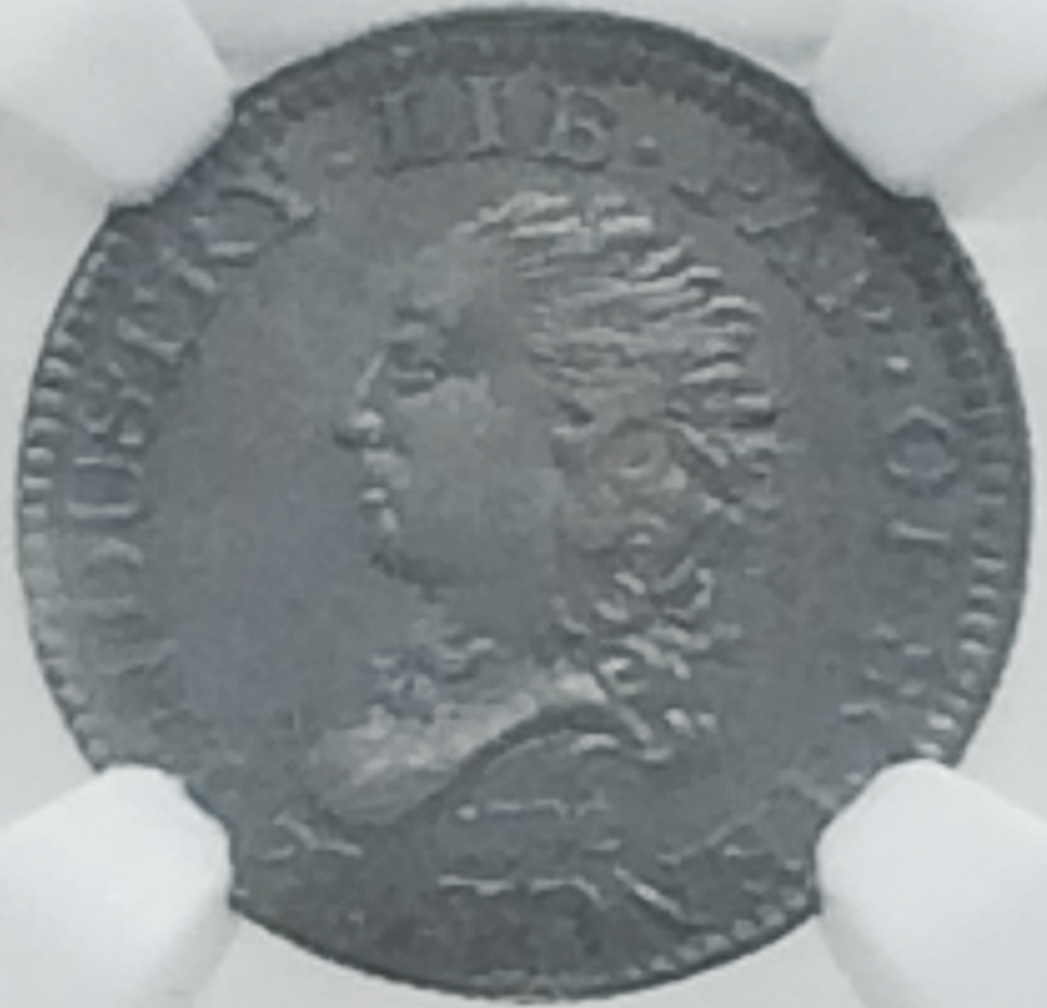
The obverse of the 1792 half disme

Eckfeldt also produced a pattern disme, of which only a few were struck. When the Mint's first cents (produced in 1793) were found to be excessively crude and attracted public ridicule, Eckfeldt was called upon to design replacements. He placed a wreath on the back of the cent instead of the original chain, and placed a trefoil under Liberty's head on the obverse. He also engraved the first half cent dies later the same year.

Eckfeldt continued to work intermittently for the Philadelphia Mint; in 1793, he built a device for automatically feeding planchets into the die collar and ejecting the struck coins, and the mint's records reveal that he did piecework there in July 1795. By October 1795 he was on the mint's payroll, as a die forger and turner, at a salary of $500 per year. On January 1, 1796, Mint Director Elias Boudinot appointed him as assistant coiner, with the consent of President Washington. His duties in that capacity were broad.

In 1805, at Boudinot's request, Eckfeldt eliminated a security problem for the Mint by renting two houses adjacent to its operations, allowing it to shut an internal alley to public access. The following year, new Mint Director Robert Patterson requested a pay increase of $200 for Eckfeldt, writing to President Thomas Jefferson that Eckfeldt had "the management of the whole coining department". When the dies used proved too brittle and cracked easily, Eckfeldt came up with the idea of spraying water on the face of the die so the steel would temper evenly.

As a boy, inventor George Escol Sellers knew Eckfeldt; as Sellers's father was partner in a firm which sold machinery to the Mint Bureau, Eckfeldt often dined at his house. In the final years both of the 19th century and of Sellers's life, he published his memoirs, including memories of the first Philadelphia Mint. He recalled in 1812 peering through a window to see cents coined, and Eckfeldt coming into the room to stop the work at the end of the day. Seeing the young Sellers, he had the boy come in, had him place a cent planchet on the press, and struck it for him. Sellers nearly dropped it because it was so hot, and Eckfeldt reminded him it had been cold when placed in the press. Eckfeldt bade him keep the coin until he learned why the cent had become hot, and then he could spend it on candy.

== Chief coiner ==
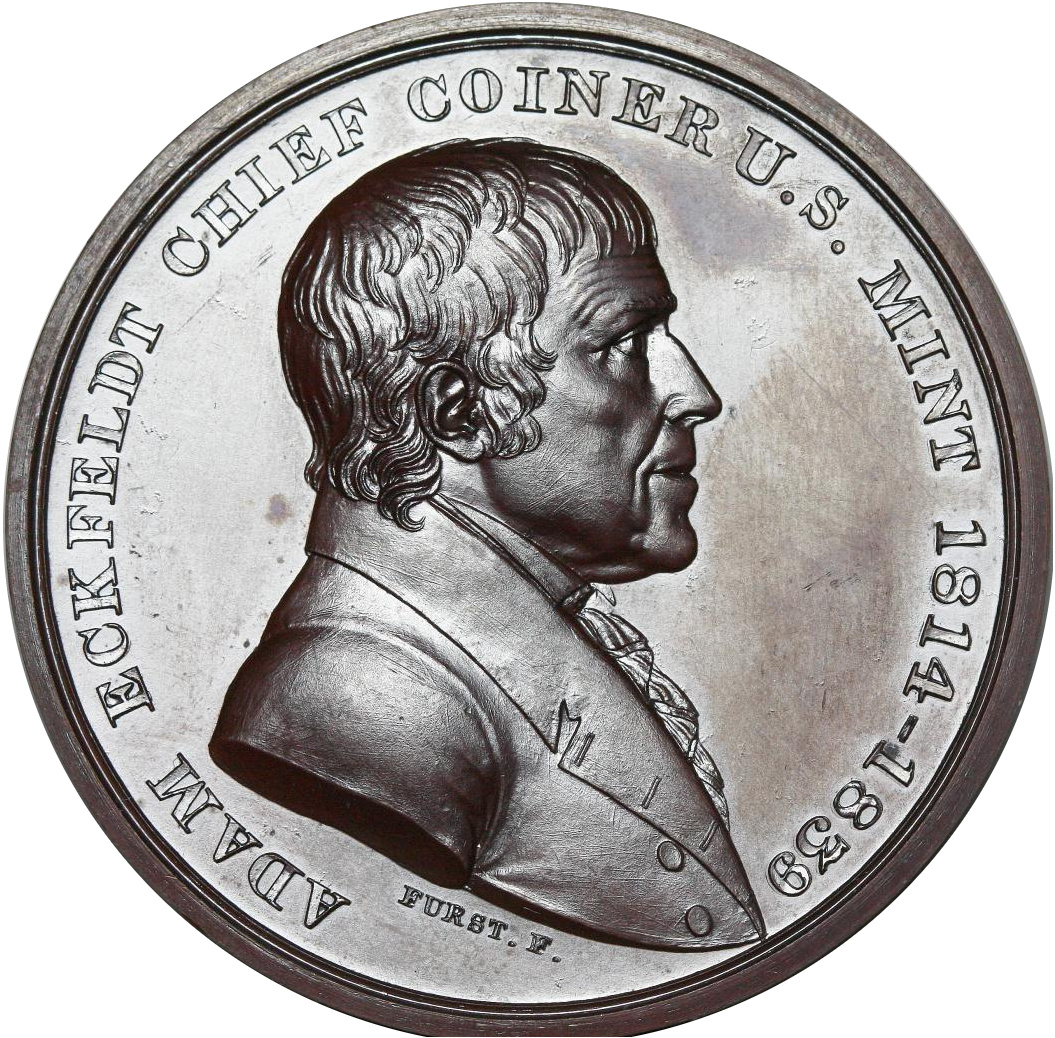
Silver replica of retirement medal for Eckfeldt, by Moritz Fuerst

On the death of the first chief coiner, Henry Voigt, in early 1814, Eckfeldt was appointed by President James Madison as successor. He served in that capacity for a quarter century. During his tenure, he continued to improve the machinery at the Philadelphia Mint.

Eckfeldt set aside "master coins"—coins struck with extra care using new dies and polished planchets. He also put aside interesting foreign coins sent to the mint as bullion. These pieces became the Mint's Cabinet, or coin collection. To fill gaps in this collection, he used old dies to strike postdated coins. Specialists have discovered that some dies he chose for this purpose had not been used together to strike coins for commerce, thus creating unique specimens. Among the pieces acquired for the Mint was a Brasher doubloon, of which only six are known today. Eckfeldt often spent from his own funds to acquire the coins for the Mint. The collection eventually evolved into the Smithsonian Institution's National Numismatic Collection.

In 1828, Eckfeldt again became involved in the real estate transactions to expand operations at the Philadelphia Mint. For $1,000, he purchased one of the lots he had rented in 1805. After the mint moved to new premises in the 1830s, Eckfeldt discovered that the lot he had purchased had a cloud, or irregularity, on its title; he was able to clear it and sold it in 1837 for the same sum for which he had bought it. The new mint building was at Juniper and Chestnut Streets, only six blocks from Eckfeldt's home at Juniper and Vine.

Sellers, in his memoirs, described Eckfeldt as "a man of staunch integrity, a cautious, careful, orderly and painstaking man; he was not one of the dashing, pushing, inventive mechanics, though under his care many apparently slight improvements were gradually adopted that in the aggregate amounted to a great deal in the economy of working. He was by no means deficient in inventive ability." Nevertheless, as Eckfeldt aged in the service of the Mint in the late 1820s and into the 1830s, he was reluctant to adopt the innovations being proposed by his fellow Mint officer, Melter and Refiner Franklin Peale. Peale, like Eckfeldt of a mechanical bent, had many suggestions for improvements to the coinage machinery, some of which Eckfeldt adopted. Eckfeldt stated to Sellers, "If Mr. Peale had full swing he would turn everything upside down". According to Sellers, "the giving up of almost life-long pets that had been Mr. Eckfeldt's constant care would naturally go hard, and still harder coming from another department, but as improvements gradually crept in and proved their efficiency Mr. Eckfeldt gave full credit where it belonged, and I remember him becoming quite enthusiastic over the labor saving [in the use of the Contamin portrait lathe] in duplicating working dies".

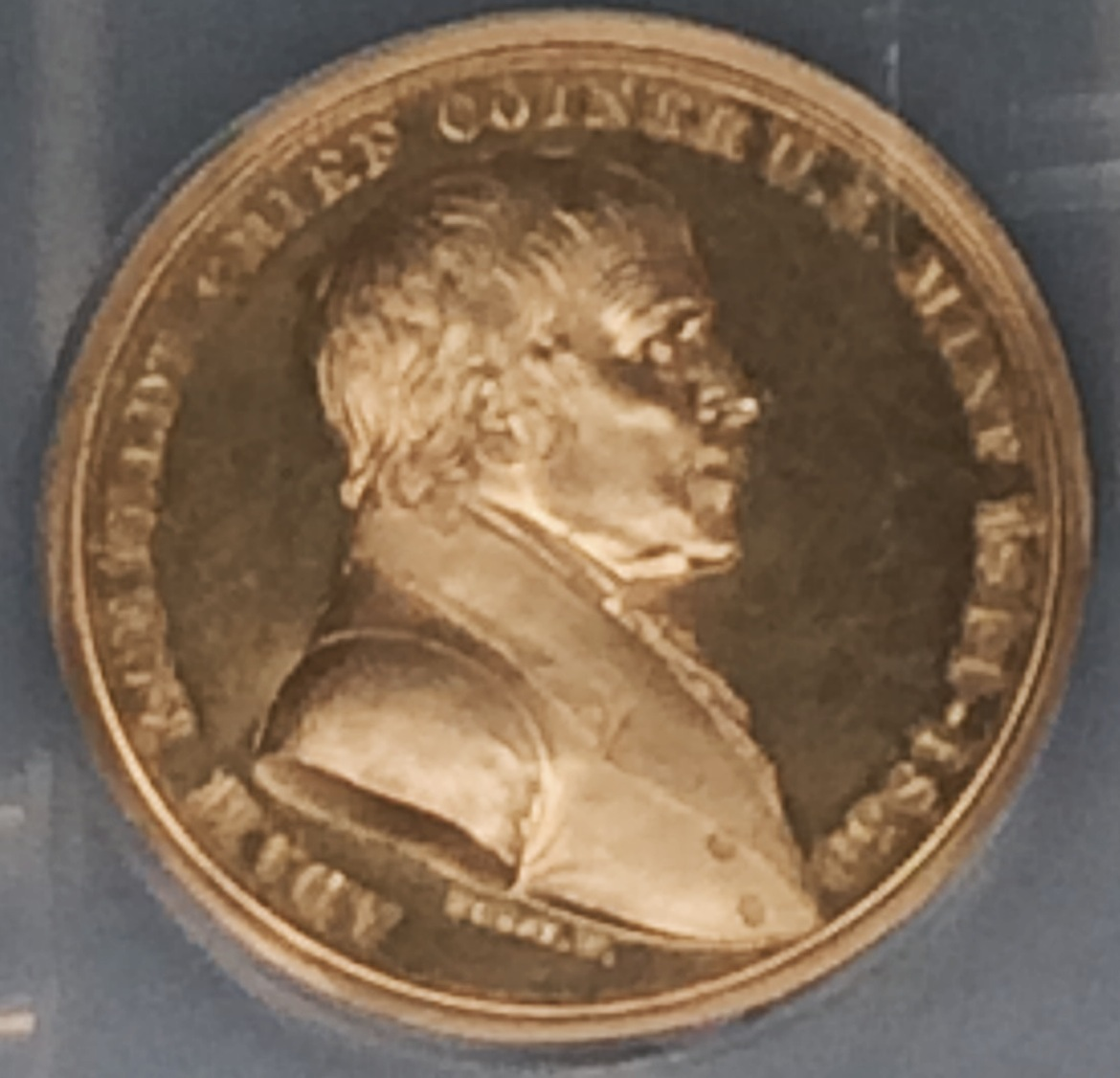
The actual gold medal presented to Eckfeldt in 1839

In 1833, Peale was sent on a tour of European mints and came home with ideas for new machines and innovations, including the introduction of steam power, used at Britain's Royal Mint since 1810 on equipment purchased from the firm of Boulton & Watt. Although Eckfeldt would have preferred to apply steam to the existing coin presses, a new one was built for steam power, and commemorative medals were the first pieces struck by steam at the Philadelphia Mint, in early 1836.

In 1839, Eckfeldt retired after 25 years as chief coiner and over forty as a Mint employee. His fellow officers at the Mint presented him with a gold medal, with silver and bronze duplicates also struck. The obverse was designed by Philadelphia engraver Moritz Fuerst, who sometimes did work for the Mint; the reverse may be by Fuerst or by Peale. Eckfeldt recommended Peale as his successor, and Peale was appointed. Nevertheless, Eckfeldt continued to perform the functions of chief coiner without pay until a few days before his death on February 6, 1852. After Eckfeldt's death, Peale wrote what Taxay terms a "frantic letter" to Mint Director George N. Eckert, seeking the appointment of an assistant. Peale had spent the freed-up time designing and selling medals for private gain.

== Private and family life ==
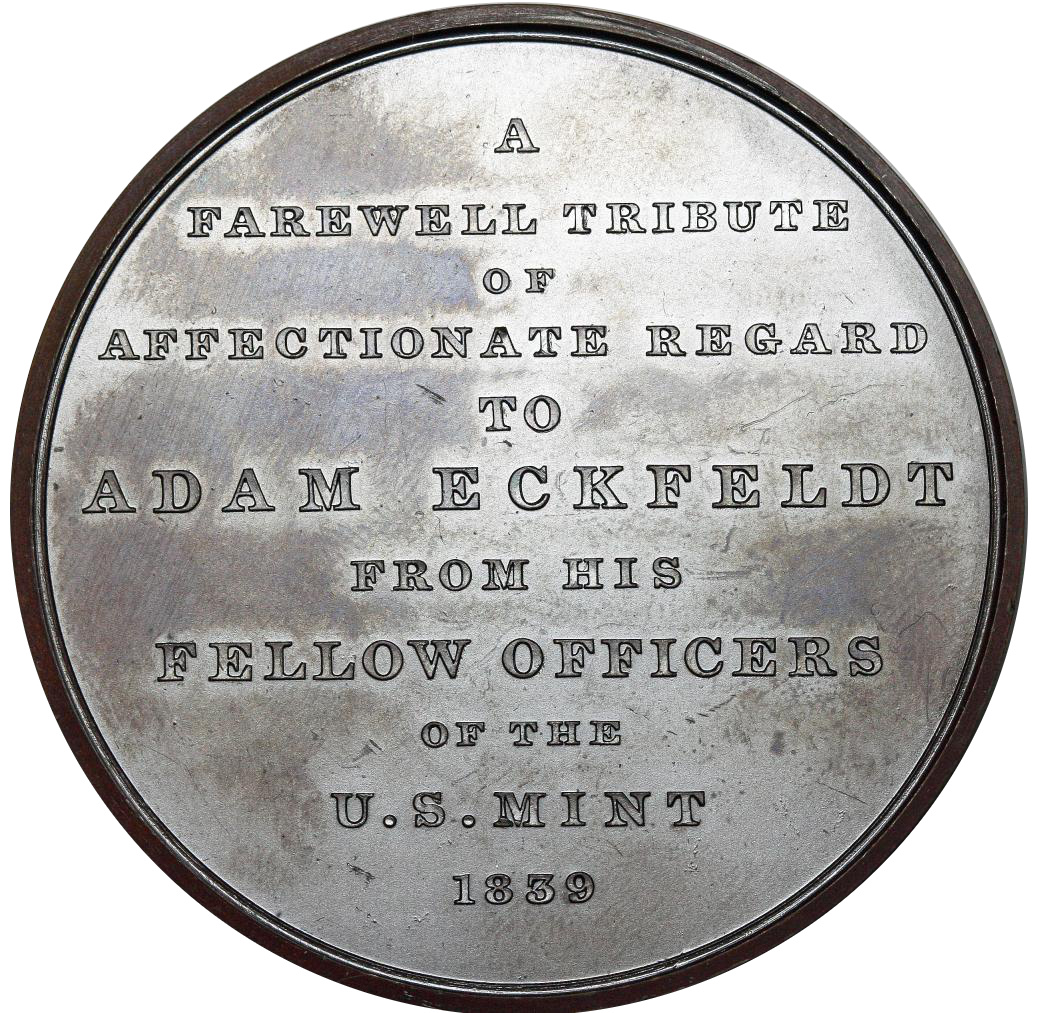
Reverse of Eckfeldt retirement medal

Eckfeldt married twice. No children were born of his brief first marriage in 1792 to Maria Hahn, which ended with her death; his second marriage to Margaretta Bausch produced six children. Among them were his daughter Susanna, who married William Ewing DuBois, first curator of the Mint's coin collection. Jacob Reese Eckfeldt, one of Adam's sons, was for forty years (1832–1872) Assayer of the United States Mint. Jacob's son Jacob Branch Eckfeldt exceeded both forebears in time of service, working at the Mint for 64 years, from 1865 to 1929.

Adam Eckfeldt had a taste for horticulture and owned rural property in Upper Darby Township, Pennsylvania, which was inherited by his two sons after his death. He was the first president of the Good Will Fire Company, holding that office for nearly all of his adult life, and designed a system of levers for use in fire engines. A member of Concordia Lodge No. 67 of the Masonic Order from 1795 to 1806, he served as lodge master in 1803; a Chinese export porcelain punch bowl with his name and Masonic symbols survives in the Philadelphia Museum of Art. A biographical sketch of Eckfeldt, published in 1897, describes him:

He was a man of large information on many subjects, possessed an inventive genius, and was enabled to introduce some excellent improvements in minting processes. He was singularly industrious and energetic, and for his social qualities and uprightness was universally respected, and, indeed, beloved by the officers associated with him and the extended circle of his acquaintance.

== Bibliography ==
- Breen, Walter (1988). Walter Breen's Complete Encyclopedia of U.S. and Colonial Coins. New York: Doubleday. ISBN 978-0-385-14207-6.
- Camparette, Louis T. (March 1906). "On the utility of a cabinet of historic coins". The Numismatist. Colorado Springs, CO: American Numismatic Association.
- Evans, George Greenlief, ed. (1885). Illustrated history of the United States Mint. Philadelphia: George G. Evans.
- Ferguson, Eugene S., ed. (1965). Early Engineering Reminiscences (1815–40) of George Escol Sellars. Washington, DC: Smithsonian Institution. OCLC 522166.
- "On fire engines, hose, and some other apparatus manufactured and used in Philadelphia, for the purpose of extinguishing fire". The Franklin Journal and American Mechanics' Magazine. Philadelphia: The Franklin Institute. May 1827.
- Hotchkin, Samuel Fitch (1897). Rural Pennsylvania in the Vicinity of Philadelphia. Philadelphia: George W. Jacobs & Co.
- Lange, David W. (2006). History of the United States Mint and its Coinage. Atlanta, GA: Whitman Publishing LLC. ISBN 978-0-7948-1972-9.
- Lee, Jean Gordon (1984). Philadelphians and the China Trade, 1784–1844. Philadelphia Museum of Art.
- Orosz, Joel J. (June 2012). "The five founding fathers of the United States Mint". The Numismatist. Colorado Springs, CO: American Numismatic Association.
- Orosz, Joel J.; Augsburger, Leonard D. (2011). The Secret History of the First U.S. Mint. Atlanta, GA: Whitman Publishing LLC. ISBN 978-0-7948-3244-5.
- Scharf, John Thomas; Westcott, Thomas (1884). History of Philadelphia. Vol. III. Philadelphia: L.H. Everts & Co.
- Smith, Pete (January 1997). "Adam Eckfeldt struck the first U.S. coins". The Numismatist. Colorado Springs, CO: American Numismatic Association.
- Taxay, Don (1983) [1966]. The U.S. Mint and Coinage (reprint ed.). New York: Sanford J. Durst Numismatic Publications. ISBN 978-0-915262-68-7.
