= Moritz Fuerst =

Moritz Fuerst (March 1782 – 1840) was an American artist of Jewish-Slovak origin. He was born in Pezinok, near Bratislava, and died in Philadelphia.

Fuerst learned engraving in the Viennese Mint. Prior to immigrating, he was enlisted by the American consul at Livorno, Italy, in 1807, and came to the United States to work as an engraver. In 1808 he settled in Philadelphia, where he set up business as a seal and steel engraver and die-sinker. He was subsequently employed by the United States Mint in Philadelphia and soon received recognition as an early American medalist. Thirty-three of his patriotic commemoratives and portraits, including his best-known work which honored heroes of the War of 1812, are still issued by the U.S. Mint. After the War of 1812, Fuerst moved to New York. He struck the official portraits of Presidents James Monroe, John Quincy Adams, Andrew Jackson and Martin Van Buren. He also executed the first recorded American Jewish medal, to commemorate the death in 1816 of the patriot and religious leader Gershom Seixas.
