= Jacob R. Eckfeldt =

United States Mint Assayer
- President: Andrew Jackson

Personal details
- Born: Jacob Reese Eckfeldt; March 1803 Philadelphia, Pennsylvania, U.S.
- Died: August 8, 1872 (aged 68–69) Philadelphia, Pennsylvania, U.S.
- Parent: Adam Eckfeldt

Jacob Reese Eckfeldt (March 1803 – August 9, 1872) was an assayer for the United States Mint in Philadelphia.

== Formative years ==
Born in Philadelphia in March 1803, Jacob R. Eckfeldt was a son of Adam Eckfeldt, chief coiner at the United States Mint. He followed his father into the same area of government service, entering the U.S. Mint during an early period in his life. He then steadily worked his way up at the Mint until becoming chief assayer.

During his tenure, he reported problems with certain lots of English sovereigns that had been sent to the Mint for recoinage, noting that these particular lots fell below the Mint's standard. Denied by English authorities as "impossible" because the London Mint "makes no mistakes," Eckfeldt was vindicated by the resulting investigation which confirmed Eckfeldt's findings. In response, parliamentary law ordered close examination of the weight and fineness of coins worldwide, which determined that coins produced in the United States were more uniform than the coins of other nations, a finding which enhanced Eckfeldt's worldwide reputation as an assayer. Appointed to his post during Andrew Jackson's presidency, Eckfeldt held that position until his death.

He was elected as a member to the American Philosophical Society in 1844.

== Death ==
Eckfeldt died in Philadelphia on August 9, 1872.
