= List of silver coins of the German Empire =

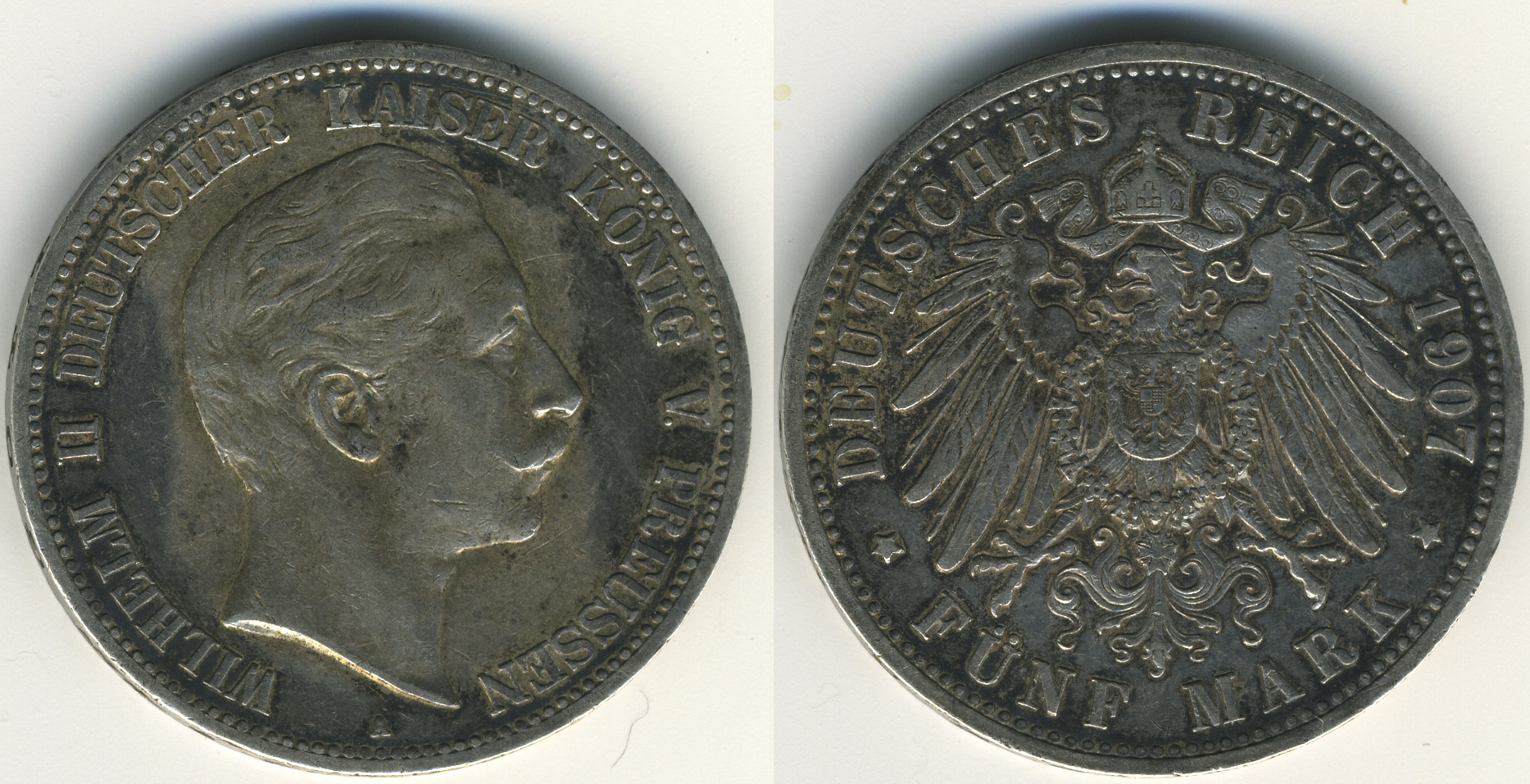
5-Mark coin of William II

The federal states of the German Empire were allowed to issue their own silver coins in denominations of 2 and 5 marks from 1873. The Coinage Act of 9 July 1873 regulated how the coins were to be designed: On the obverse, or image side, only the state sovereign or the coat of arms of the free cities of Hamburg, Bremen or Lübeck was to be depicted, and the coin had to have a pearl circle. On the reverse, or denomination side, only the Imperial Eagle to a certain design was allowed. In addition, further silver coins were issued in denominations of 20 pfennigs, 50 pfennigs and 1 Mark. However, these were not stamped with a portrait of a ruler, since they were not issued by individual states.

The new silver Mark coins were not intended to constitute the monetary standard; under the imperial coinage laws, they served as subsidiary currency within the gold standard. Their introduction was accompanied by the withdrawal and melting down of most of the older silver currencies issued by the German states. Plans to sell the recovered silver were abandoned in 1879 after its market price had fallen. The Vereinstaler was an exception: it remained legal tender at a value of three marks until 1907.

In 1908, 3-mark coins were minted for the first time; the same provisions applied as for the 2- and 5-mark coins.

The provisions of 1873 were relaxed by the Coinage Act of 1 June 1909; other motifs could now also be depicted on commemorative coins, and the pearl circle was no longer mandatory; the value side was also allowed to have a different design.

Some coins were produced in very high numbers, such as the circulation and commemorative coins of the Kingdom of Prussia. In smaller territories with correspondingly small populations, far fewer coins—especially commemorative coins—were produced. Due to the First World War, only 100 examples of the Saxon 3 Mark commemorative coin marking the 400th anniversary were minted in 1917, and issues commemorating state anniversaries in Hesse (1917) and Bavaria (1918) were only minted in low numbers.

The coins were valid throughout the Empire, so that coins from Baden could also be used in Prussia, for example.

== Mints ==
The silver coins of the Empire were minted at nine different mints:

Mint symbol	Place	Period
A	Berlin	from 1872
B	Hanover	1872–1878
C	Frankfurt	1872–1879
D	Munich	from 1872
E	Dresden	1872–1887
E	Muldenhütten	1887–1953
F	Stuttgart	from 1872
G	Karlsruhe	from 1872
H	Darmstadt	1872–1882
J	Hamburg	from 1875

== Denominations up to 1 Mark ==
The smaller silver coins of the German Empire were issued from 1873 at nominal values of 20 Pfennig and 1 Mark. 50 Pfennig coins were struck by the mints from 1875. As early as 1877, the 20-pfennig silver coins were replaced by cupro-nickel coins. From 1891, the design changed slightly, as it also did on the higher denominations: the Imperial Eagle now depicted a small coat of arms instead of the larger coat of arms used up to that point. After 1903 no more coins with the nominal value 50 Pfennig were struck; instead these coins bore the nominal value of ½ Mark.

Denominations	Obverse	Reverse	Minting period	Weight	Diameter of the coin	Edge design
20 Pfennig	20 pfennig	20 pfennig	1873–1877	1.111 g	16.0 mm	110 notches
50 Pfennig	50 Pfennig	50 Pfennig	1875–1877	2.778 g	20.0 mm	126 notches
50 Pfennig			1877–1878	2.778 g	20.0 mm	126 notches
50 Pfennig			1896; 1898; 1900–1903	2.778 g	20.0 mm	126 notches
½ Mark	½ Mark	½ Mark	1905–1919	2.778 g	20.0 mm	90 notches
1 Mark	1 Mark	1 Mark	1873–1883; 1885–1887	5.556 g	24.0 mm	140 notches
1 Mark	1 Mark	1 Mark	1891–1894; 1896; 1898–1916	5.556 g	24.0 mm	140 notches

They were produced in all the mints, although several did not produce all the denominations in every year.

These coins, like the 2-, 3-, and 5-mark pieces, were made from 900/1000 silver.

== Denominations from 2 Mark ==
=== Size and weight ===
All coins were made of 900/1000 silver.

The 2 Mark coins are 11.111 grams in weight and have a diameter of 28 mm.

The 3 Mark coins are 16.667 grams in weight and have a diameter of 33 mm.

The 5 Mark coins are 27.778 grams in weight and have a diameter of 38 mm.

In general, a Mark represented 5 grams of silver. A 5 Mark silver coin thus contained 25 g of silver; by contrast there were also 5 Mark gold coins with a content of 1.79 g of gold.

Gold coins of 10 and 20 Mark were subject to a legal minimum weight (Passiergewicht), below which they were withdrawn from circulation.

=== Reverse side images ===
The Imperial Eagle is depicted on the reverse of the silver coins. There are two variants: the eagle with a large coat of arms ("little eagle") and the eagle with a small coat of arms ("big eagle"). The former was used until 1889, the latter from 1891. No silver coins were minted in between those dates.

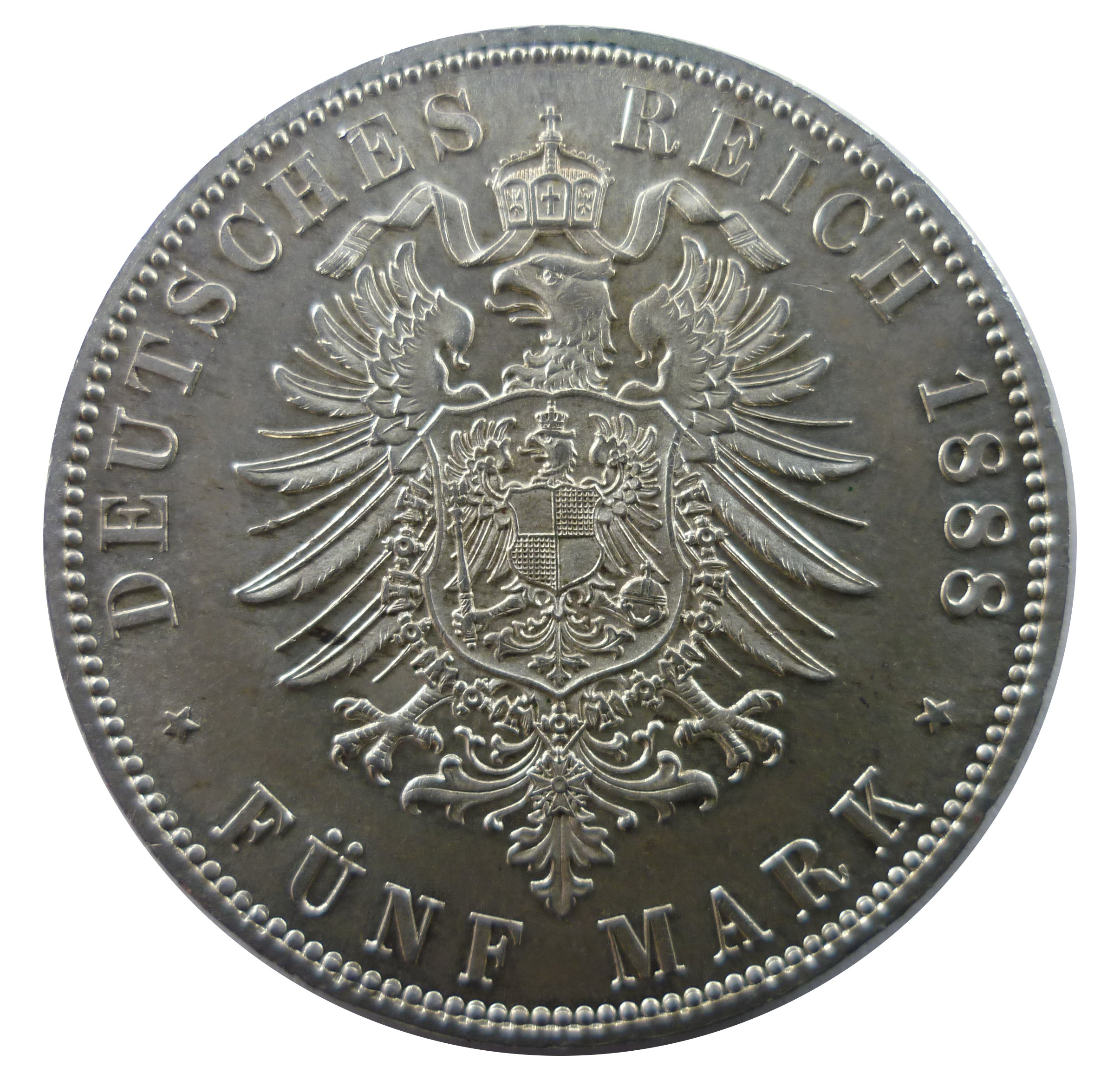
Eagle with large coat of arms ("little eagle")

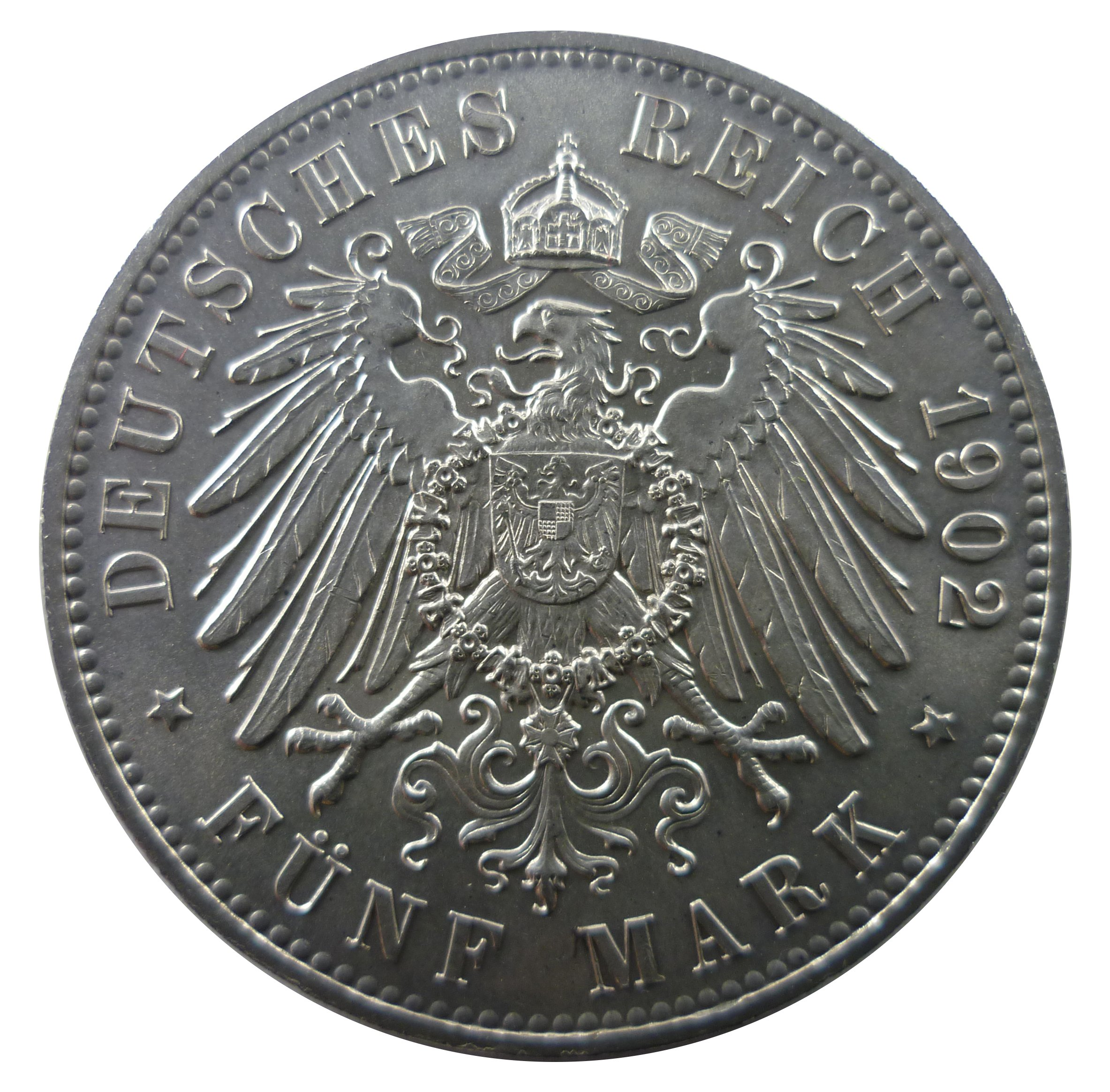
Eagle with small coat of arms ("large eagle")

The inscription reads:

GERMAN EMPIRE --year--
--Value--

==== Exceptions ====
The 1909 coinage allowed the value side to be changed as well:

- On the reverse of the coins "Centenary of the Grand Duchy 1915" (Mecklenburg-Schwerin) and "Centenary of the accession of the County of Mansfeld" (Prussia) another form of imperial eagle can be seen, the so-called "war eagle".
- The Prussian 3 Mark coins "Centenary of the University of Berlin" and "Centenary of the University of Breslau" also bear other forms of imperial eagle.
- A variation of the imperial eagle (Art Nouveau eagle) is embossed on the reverse of the "Centenary of the Grand Duchy of Saxe-Weimar-Eisenach" coin.
- The reverse of the coin "Centenary of the Wars of Liberation against France" features an eagle clutching a snake (a symbol of Napoleonic foreign rule).
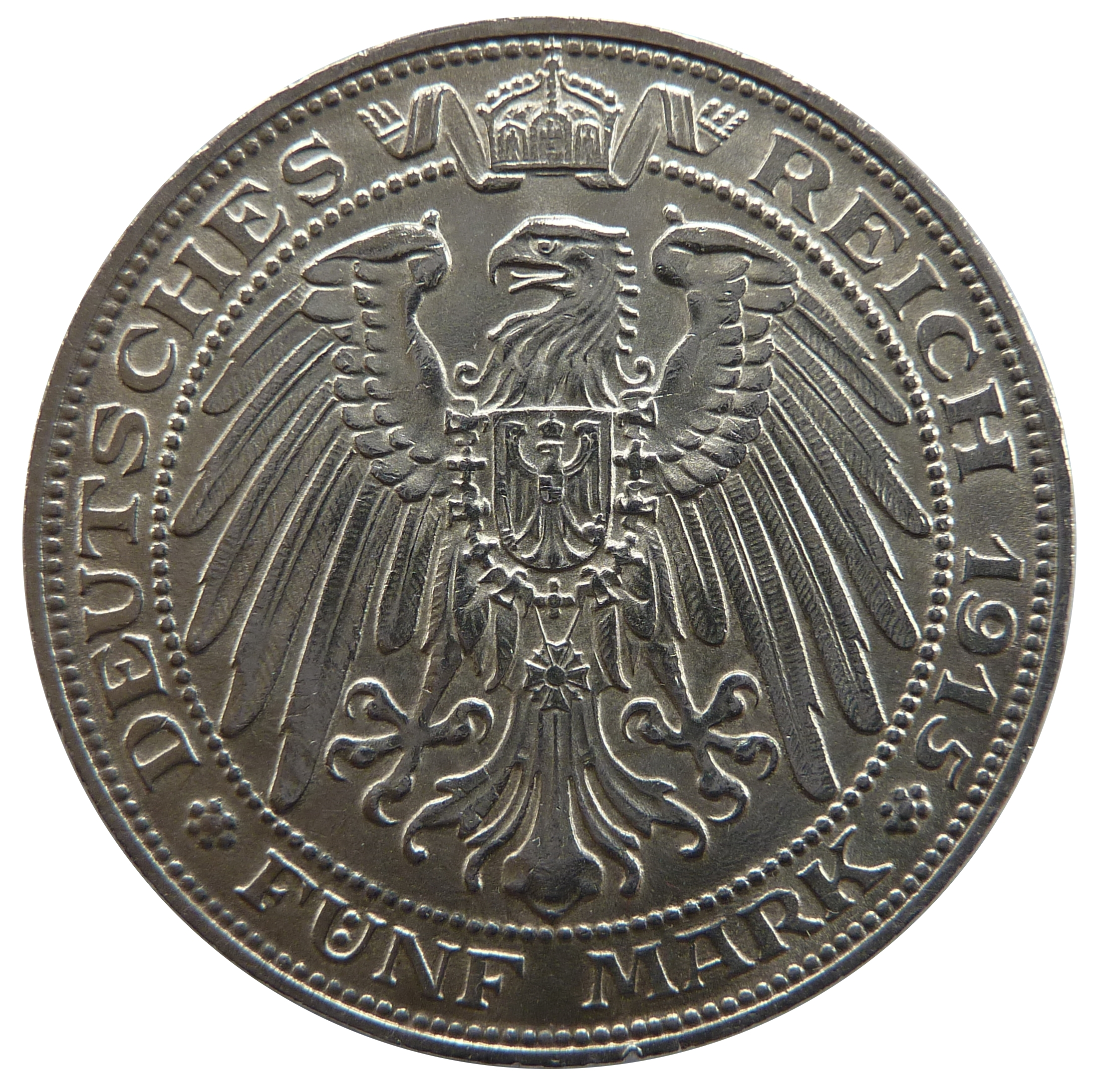
Reverse of the coin "Centenary of Mecklenburg-Schwerin"

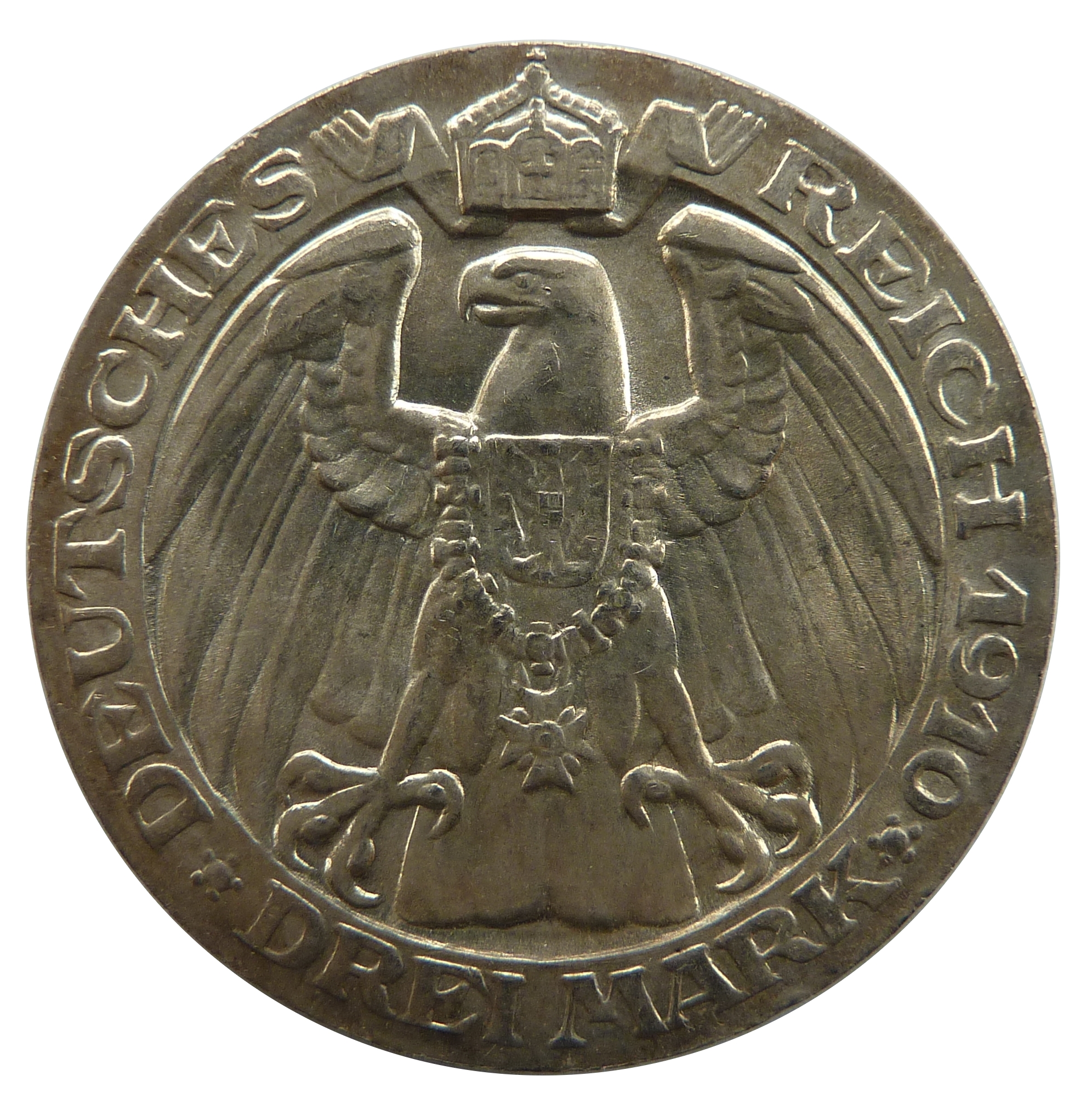
Reverse of the coin "Centenary of the University of Berlin"

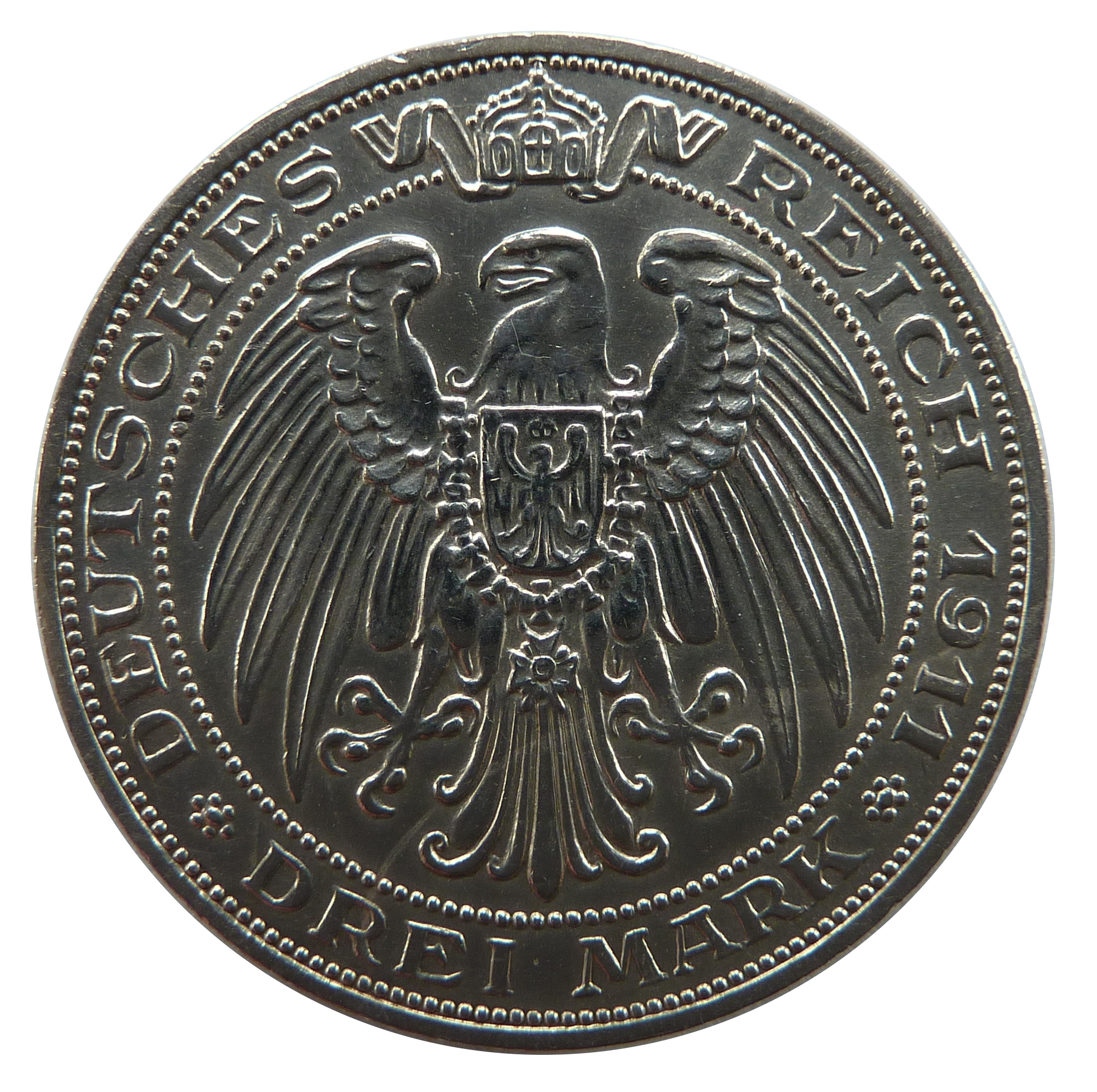
Reverse of the coin "Centenary of the University of Breslau"

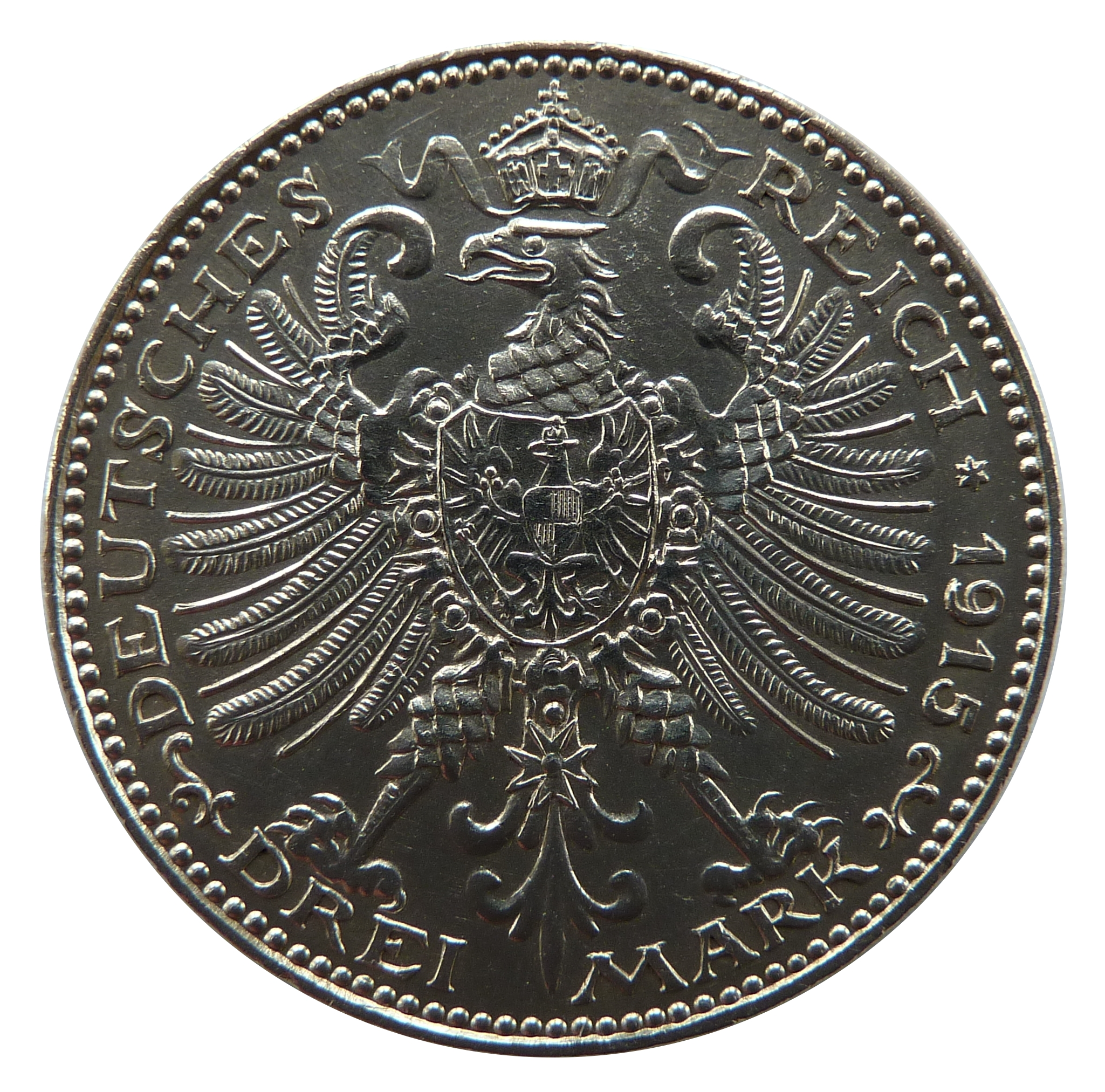
Reverse of the coin "Centenary of Saxe-Weimar-Eisenach"

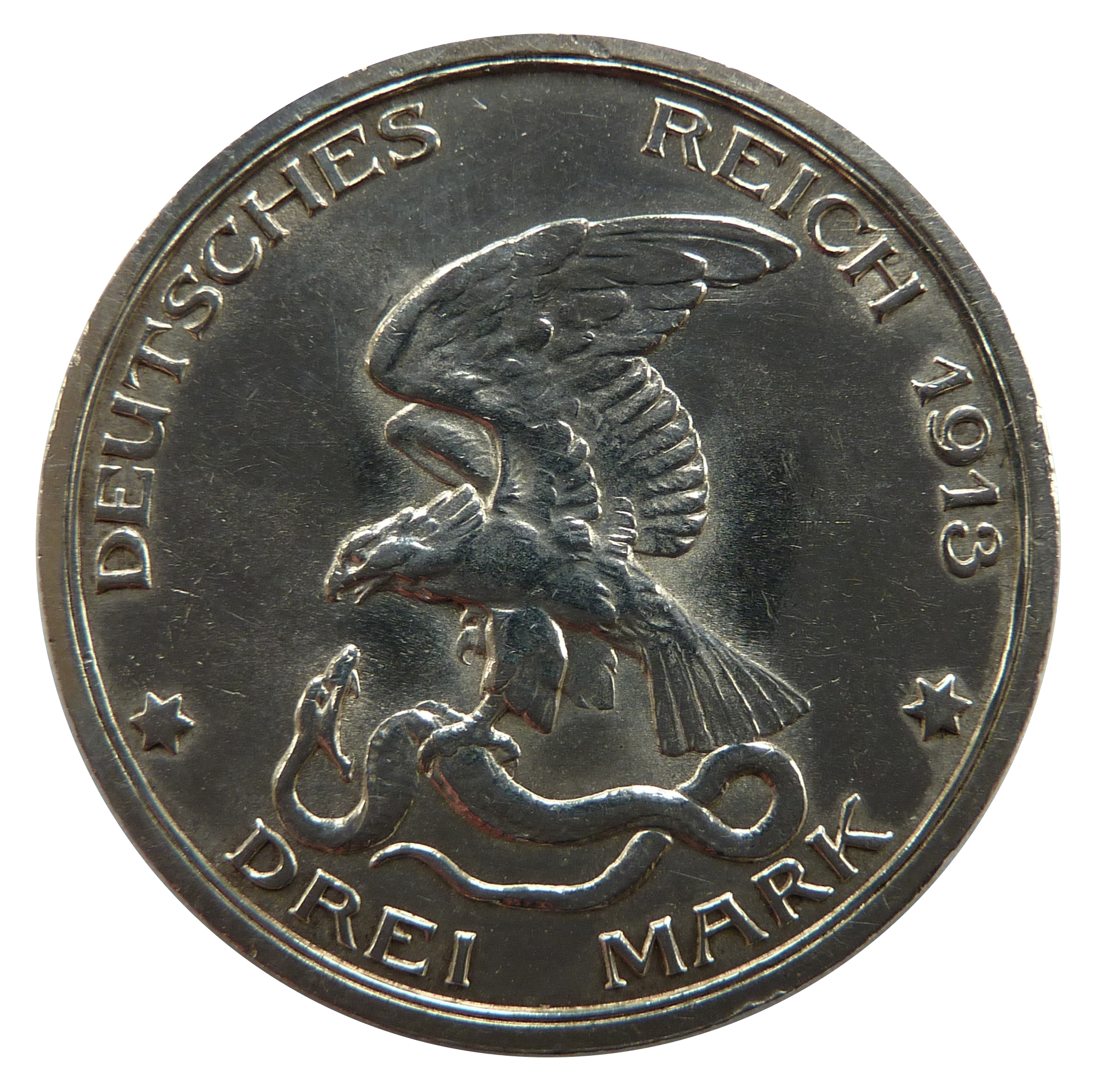
Reverse of the coin "Centenary of the Wars of Liberation"

=== Edge ===
The edge of the 2 Mark coin is milled with 140 notches, while the edges of the 3 and 5 Mark coins are stamped with the inscription GOTT MIT UNS ("God with Us"). Between the words are two arabesques with an iron cross between them.

=== List ===
The following is a table of the silver coins issued by the German Empire.

Legend:

Face Value: The face value of a coin is the denomination stated on the coin and at which the coin was most often issued.

Year of Issue: The year of issue is the year in which a particular coin was minted and issued.

Circulation/commemorative coin: A circulation coin is one without a specified reason for issue. It depicts only the portrait of the prince or the coat of arms of the city. In addition, it is usually issued over several years. A commemorative coin is one issued for a specific occasion, such as a state anniversary or the ruler's birthday. These coins were each only produced in one year. However, like the circulation coins, they were official means of payment.

Occasion/Motif: The occasion of a commemorative coin or the motif of a circulation coin is given here.

Mint: The mint that produced the coins is listed here (see above); in most cases, the coins were produced by only one mint.

Minted condition:

- MS: These coins were minted in the normal way. However, the majority are no longer in "mint uncirculated" condition, as they have worn out over time.
- PF: These coins were minted in a special way, separately from the others. They were minted from polished planchets using specially polished dies. This causes the bumps on the coin to appear dull while the surface is reflective. These coins are usually more expensive than the normal minted coins, as they were also minted in smaller numbers in most cases. If the word available is in the "PF" column, it means that the number of PF coins is not known.

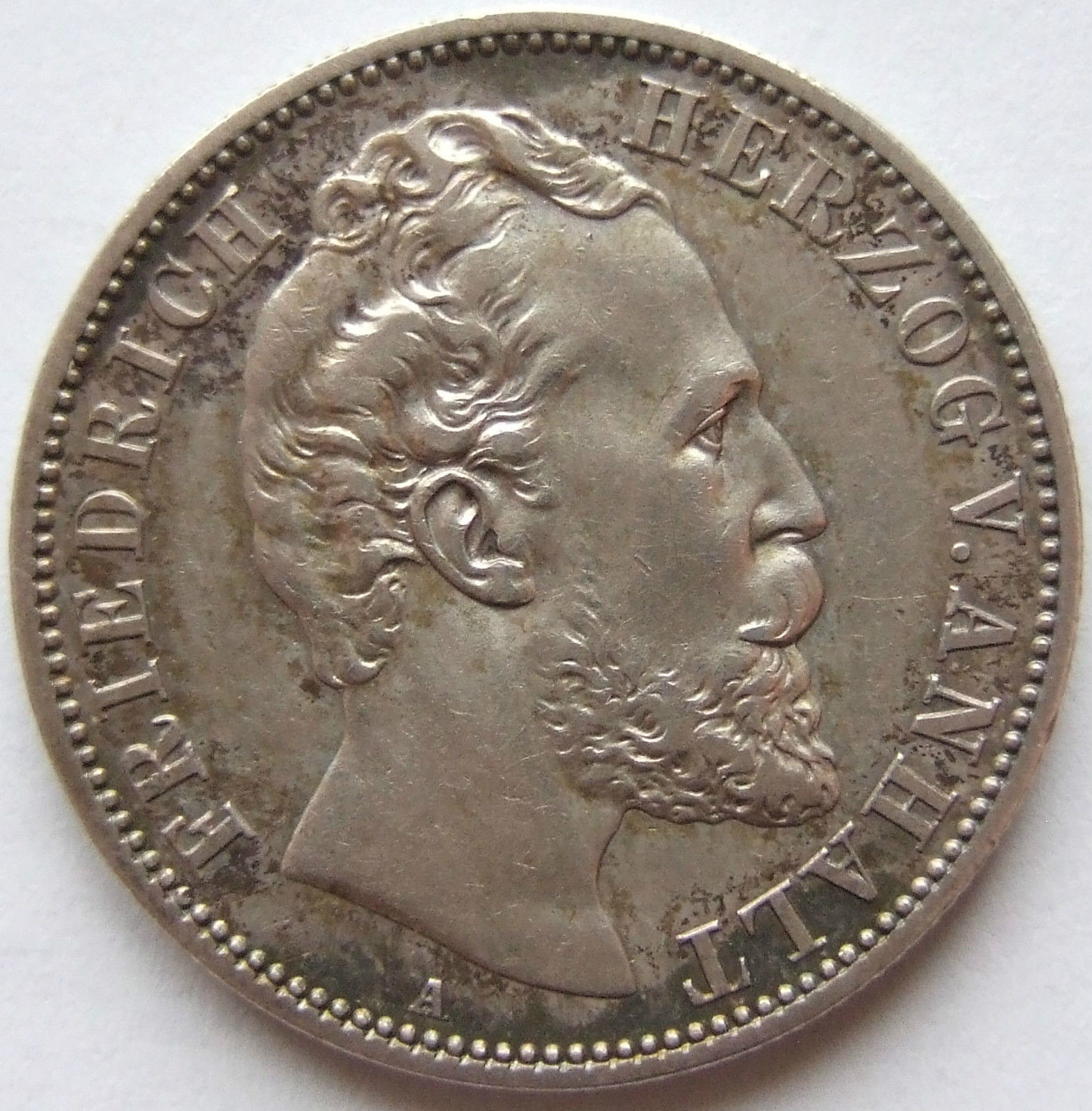
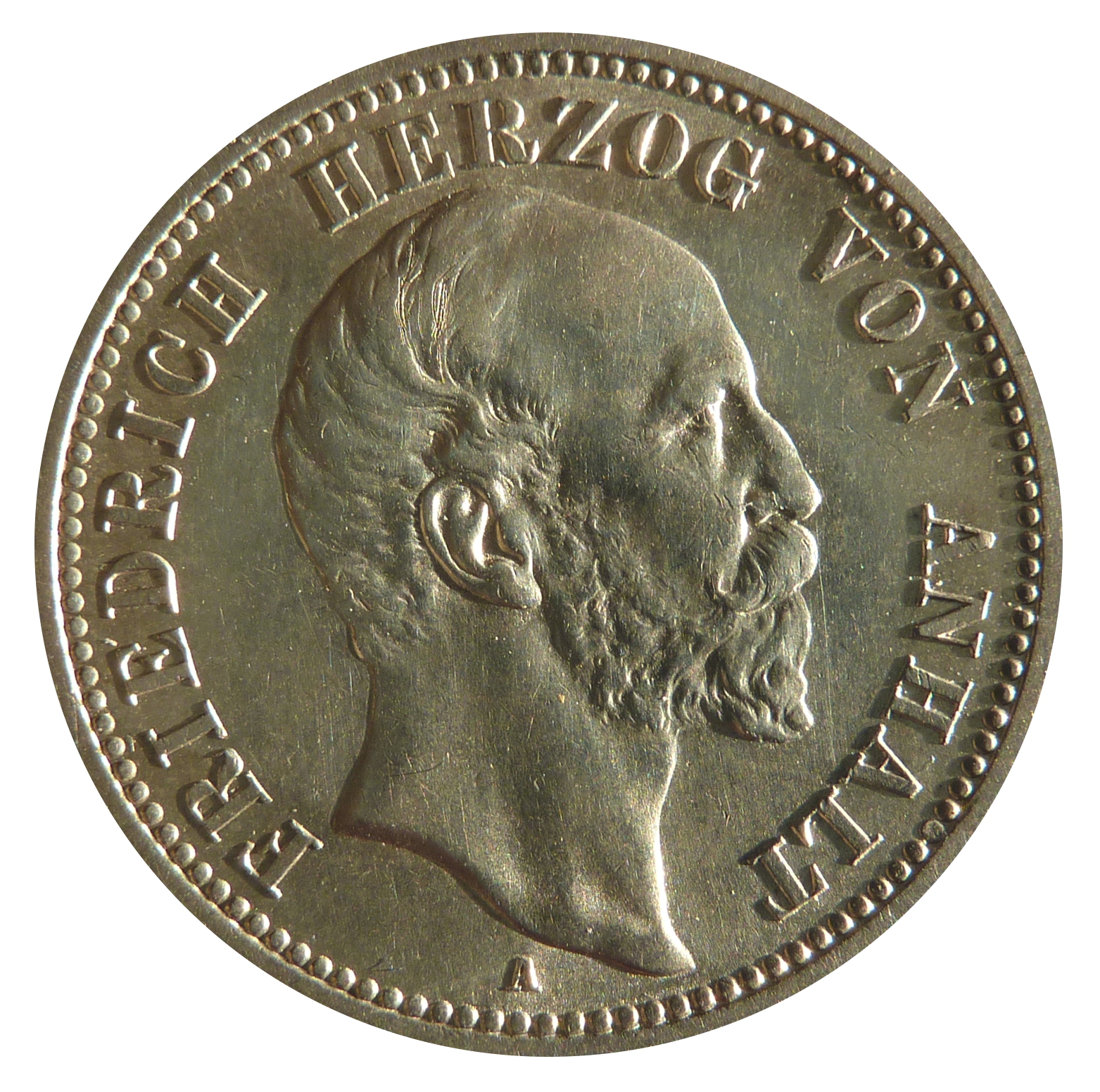
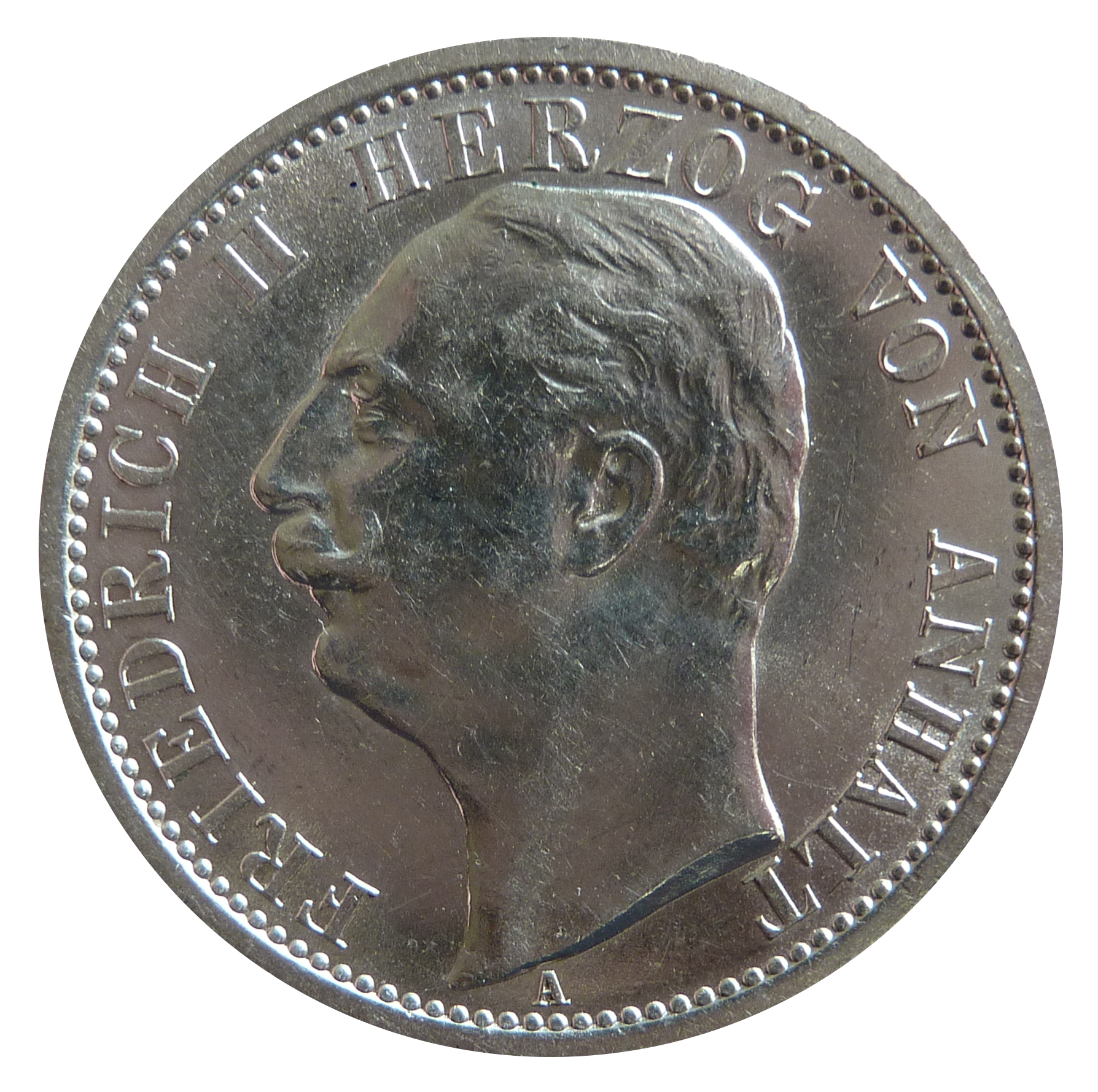
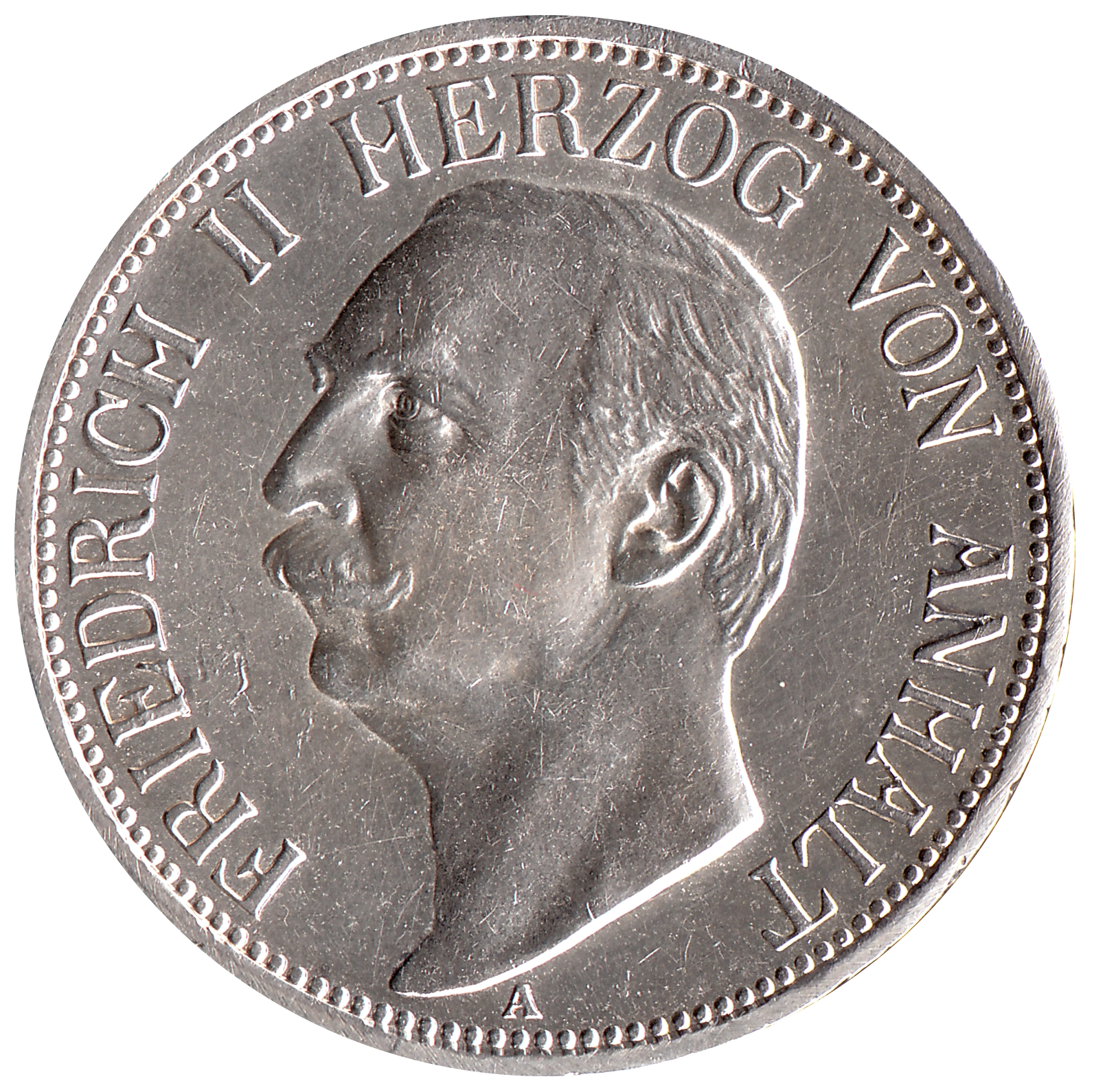
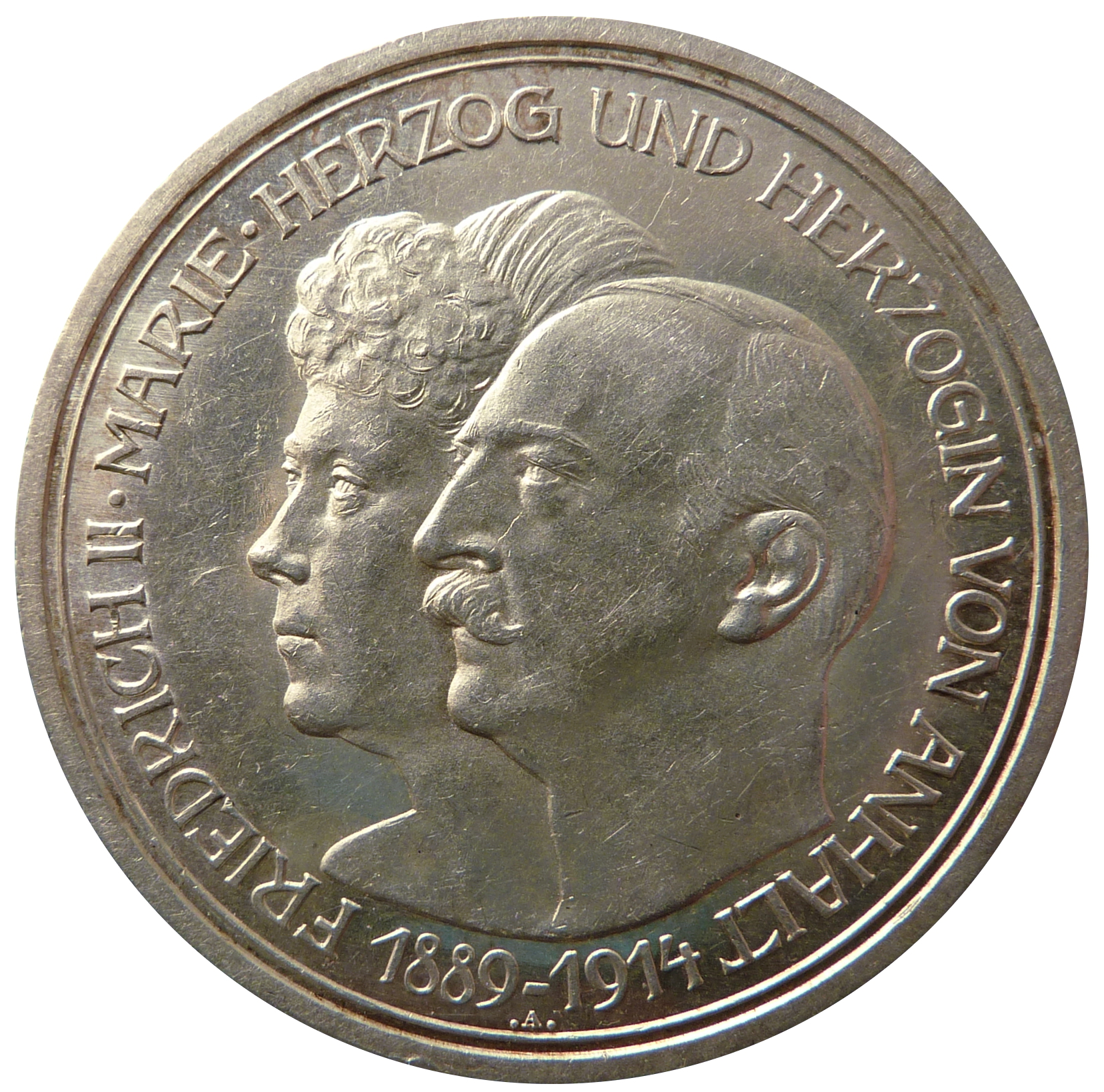
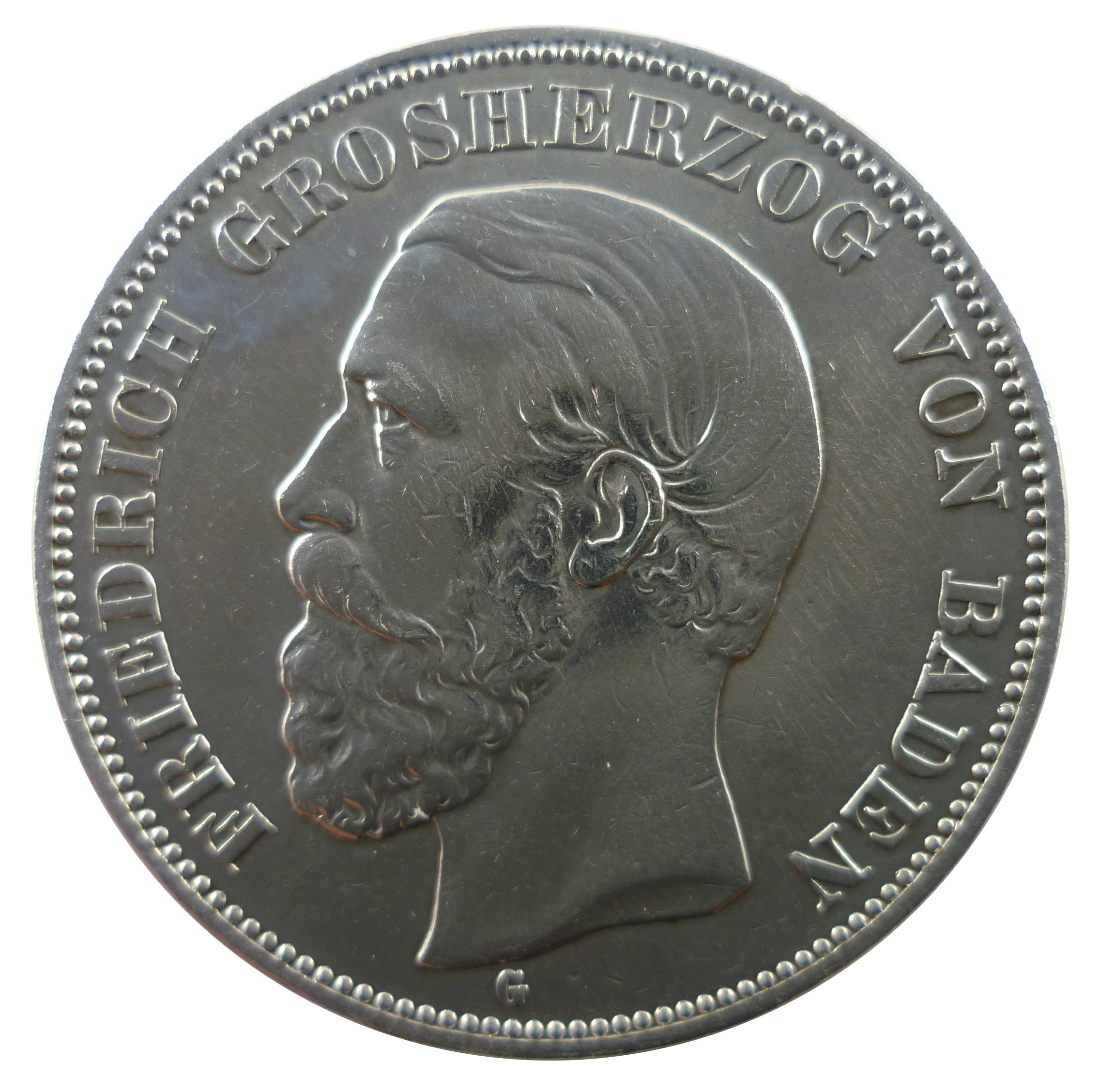
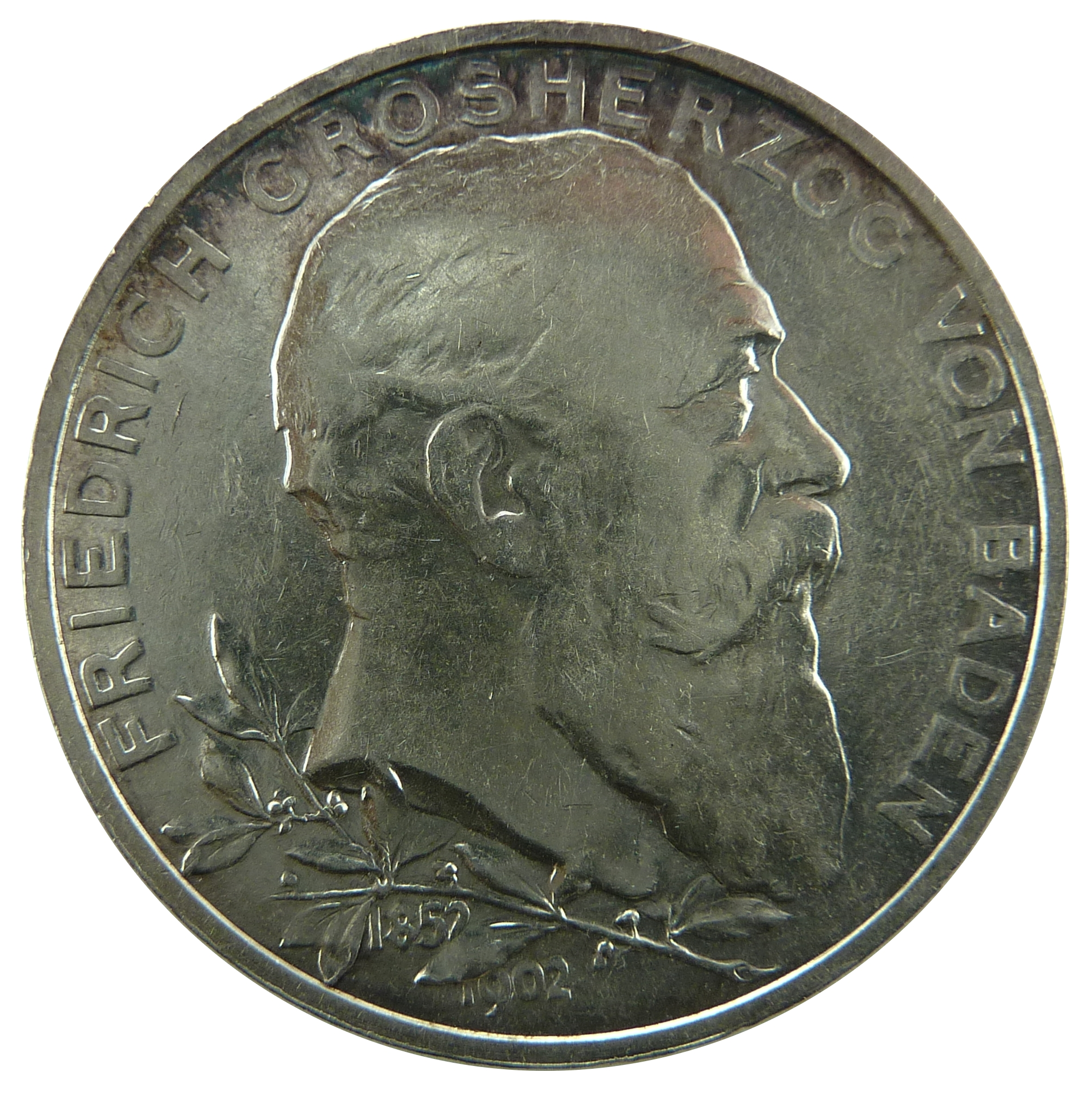
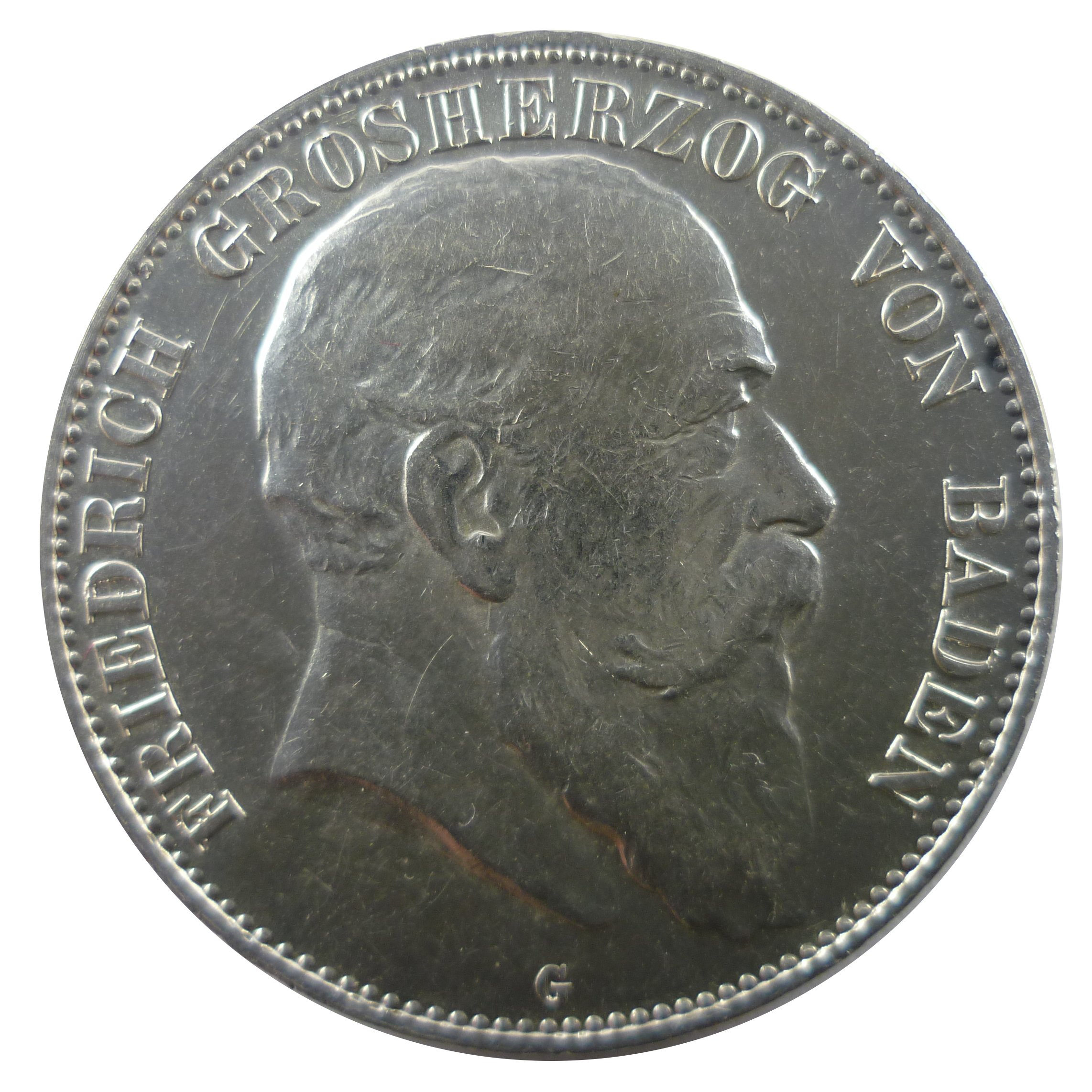
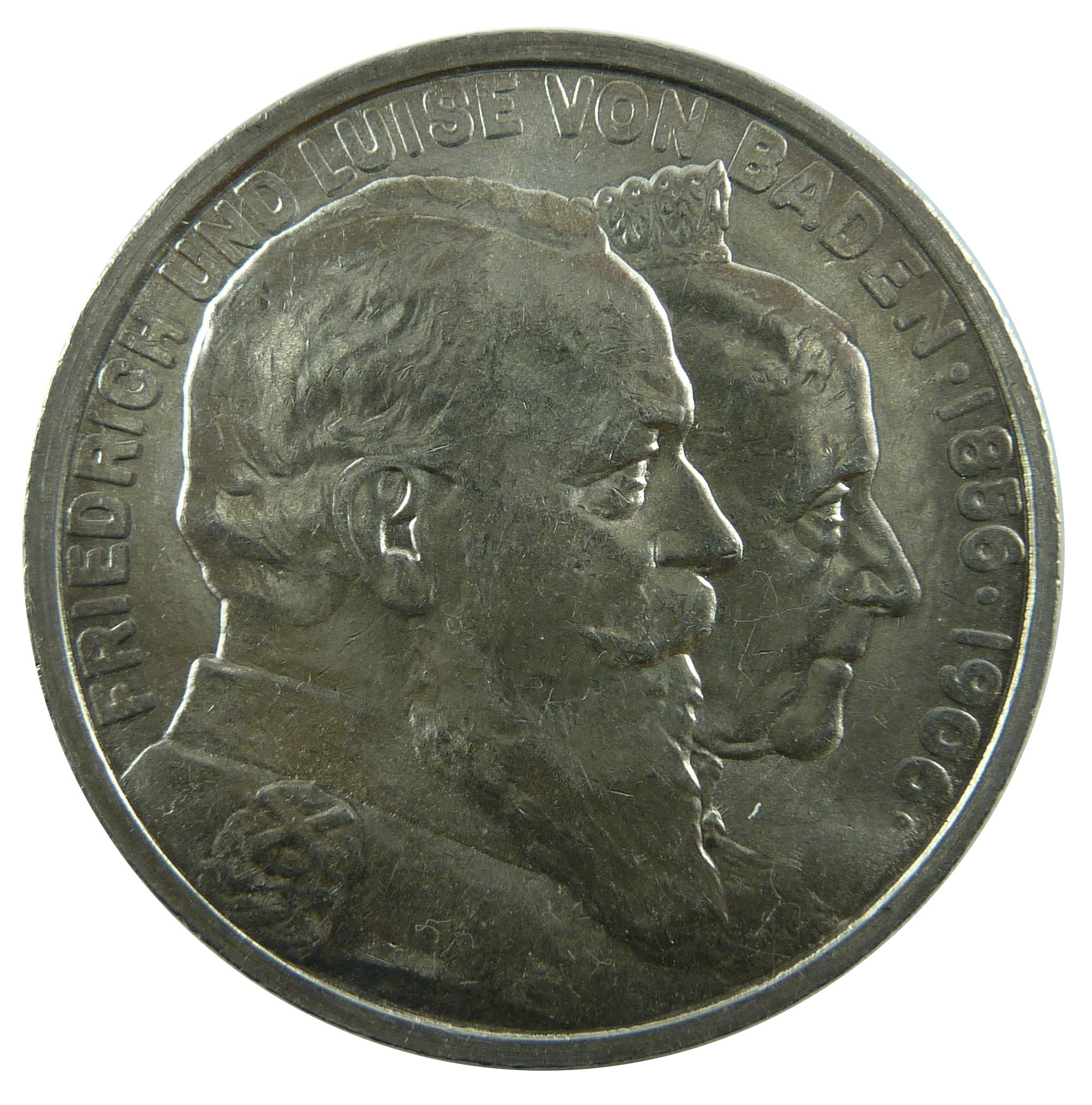
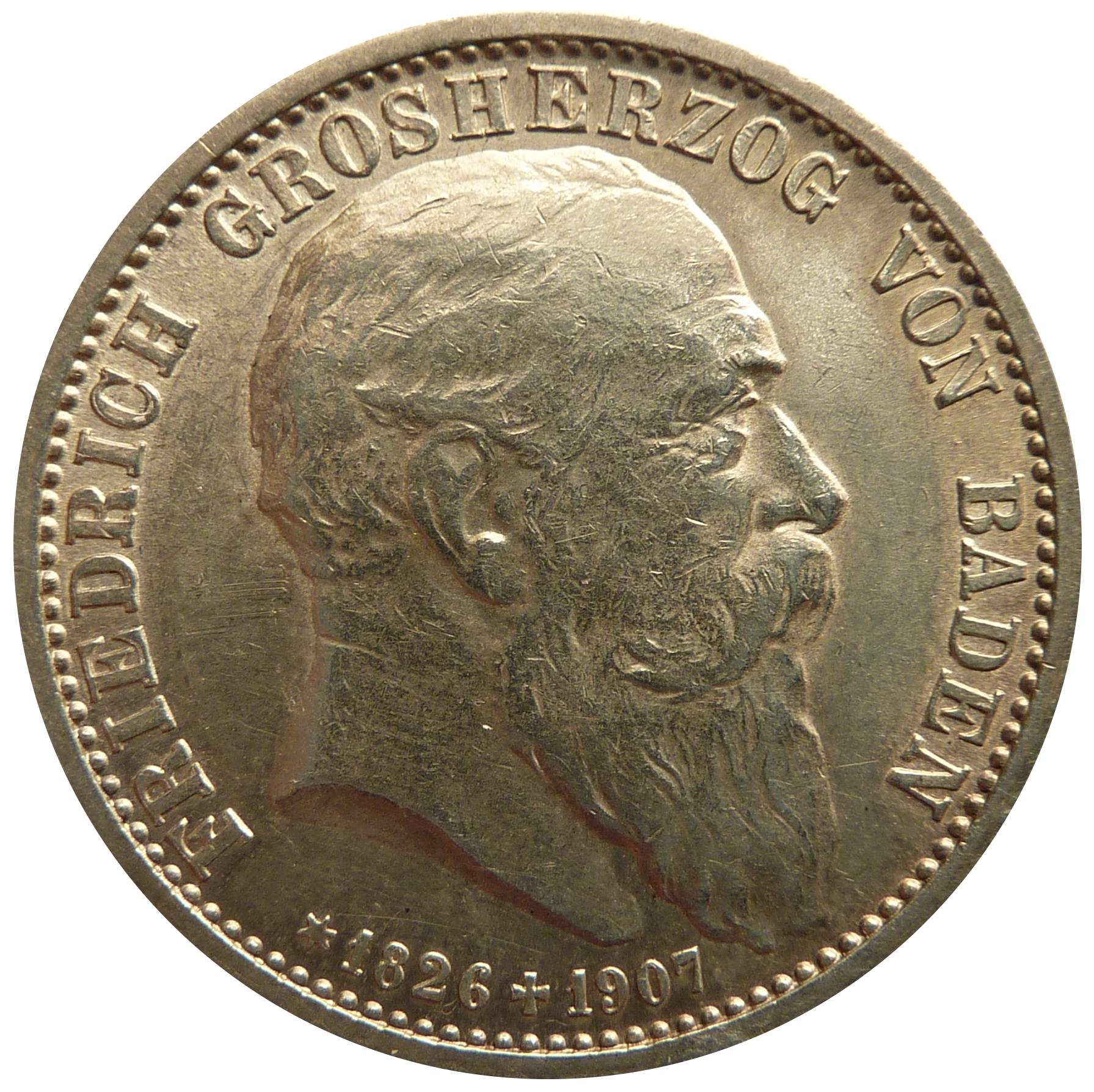
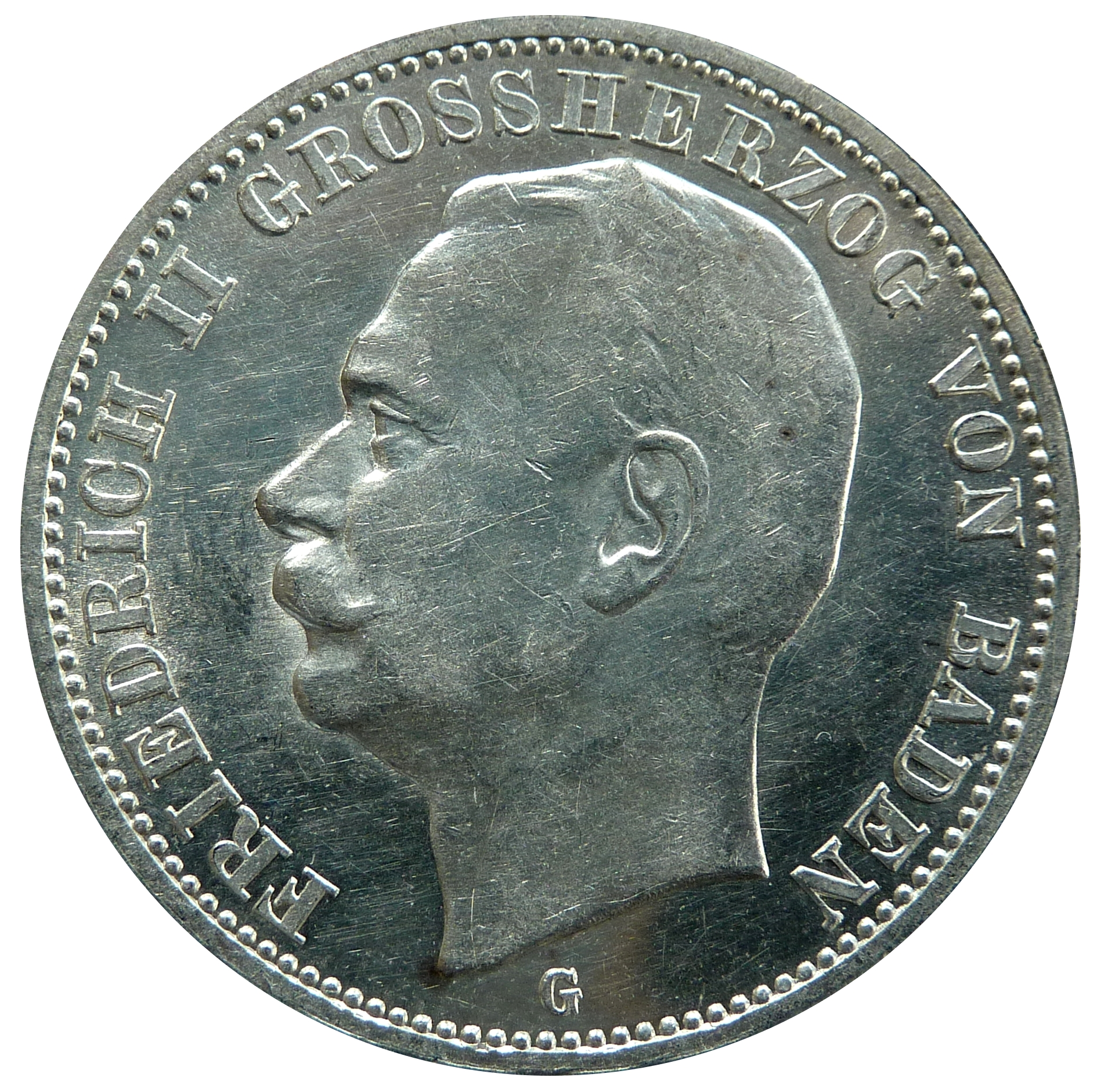
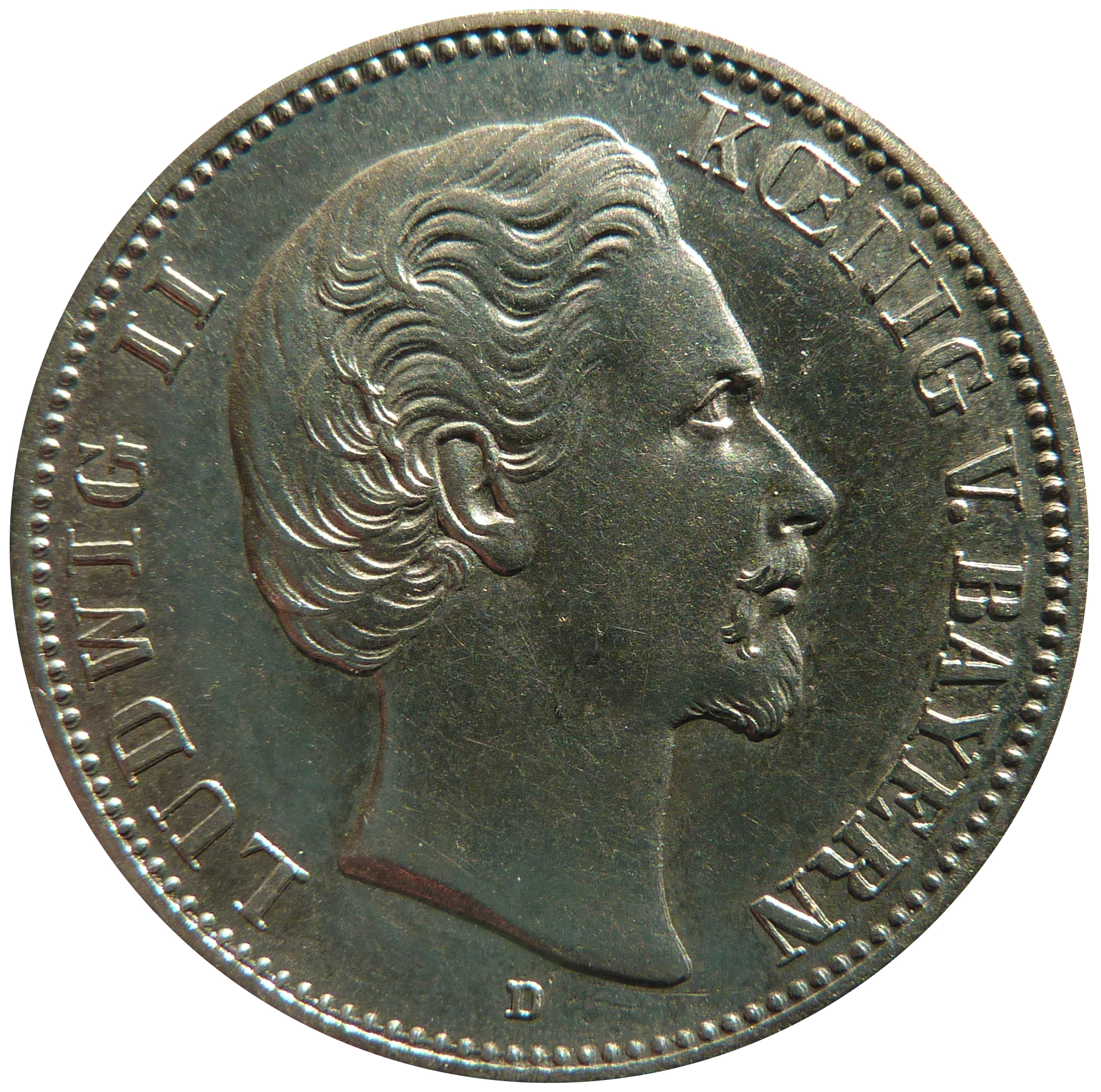
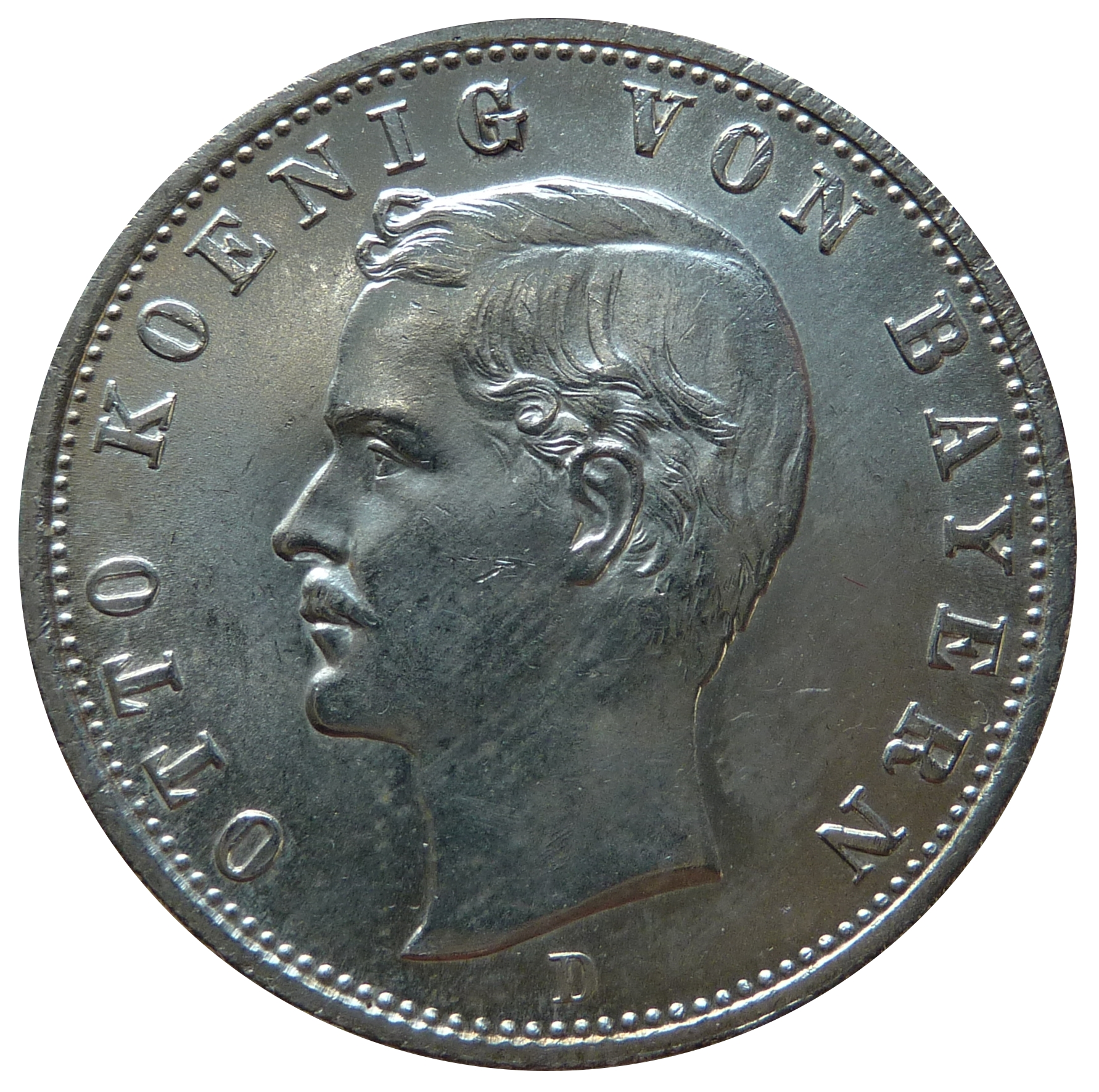
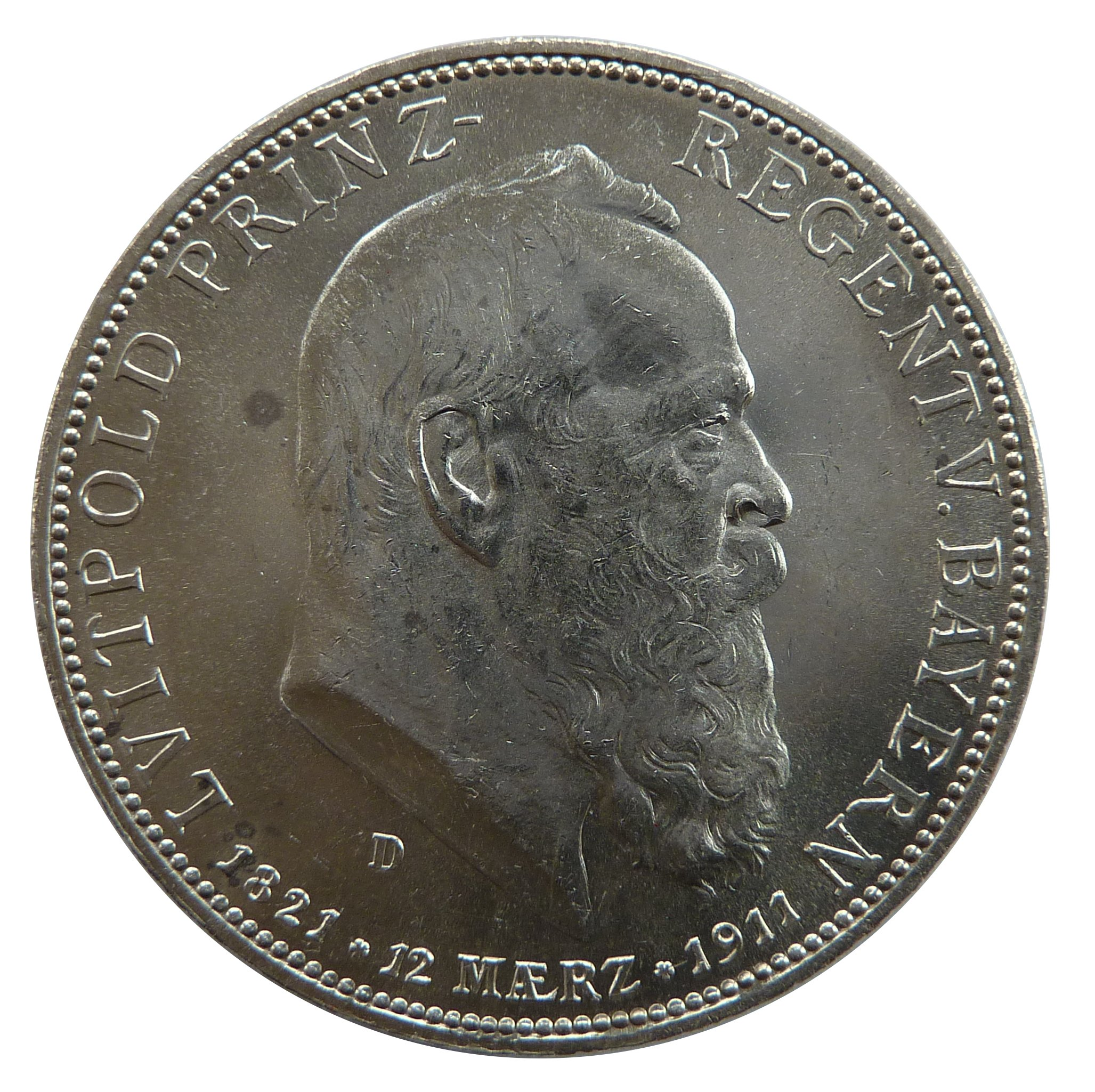
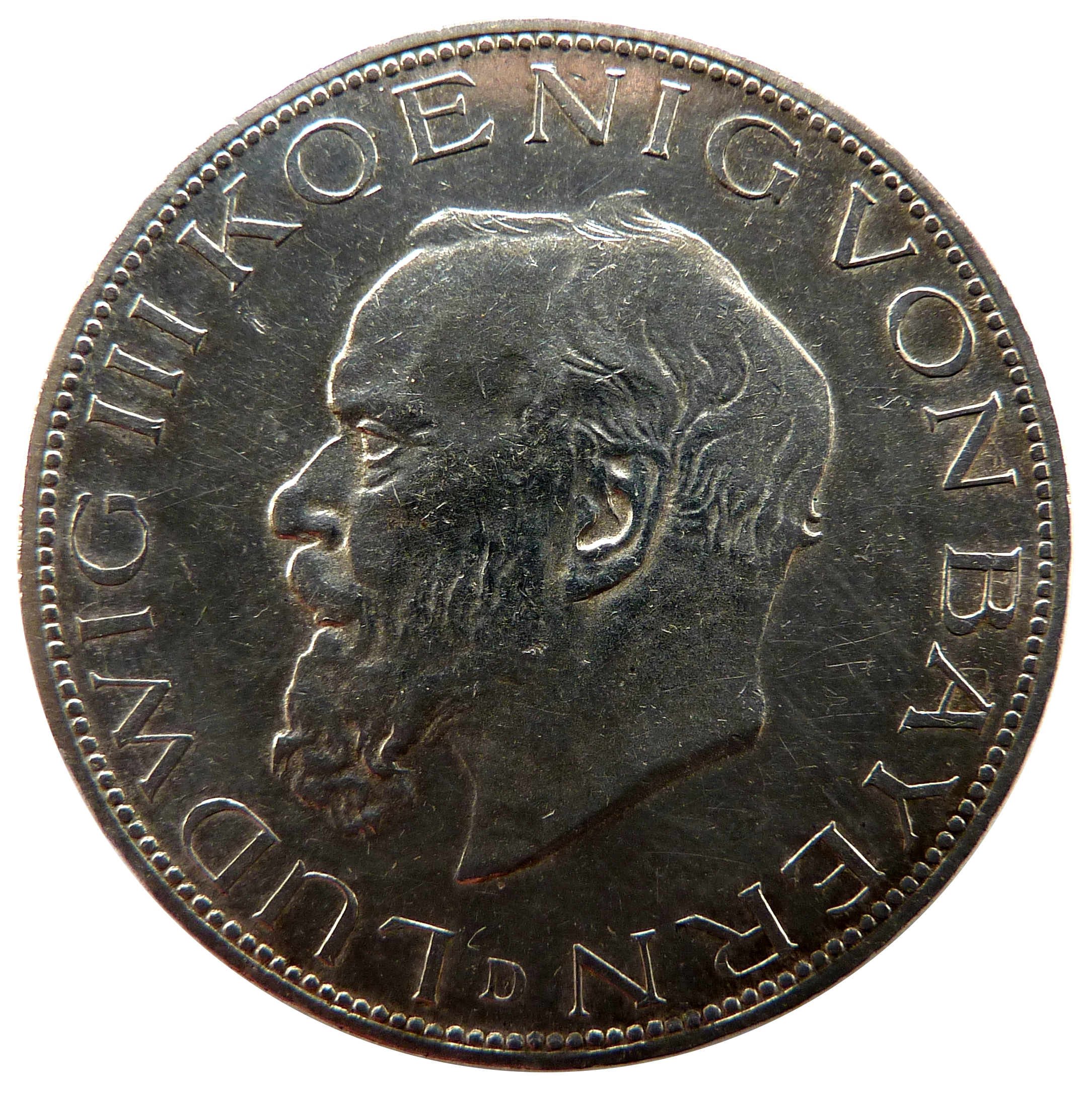
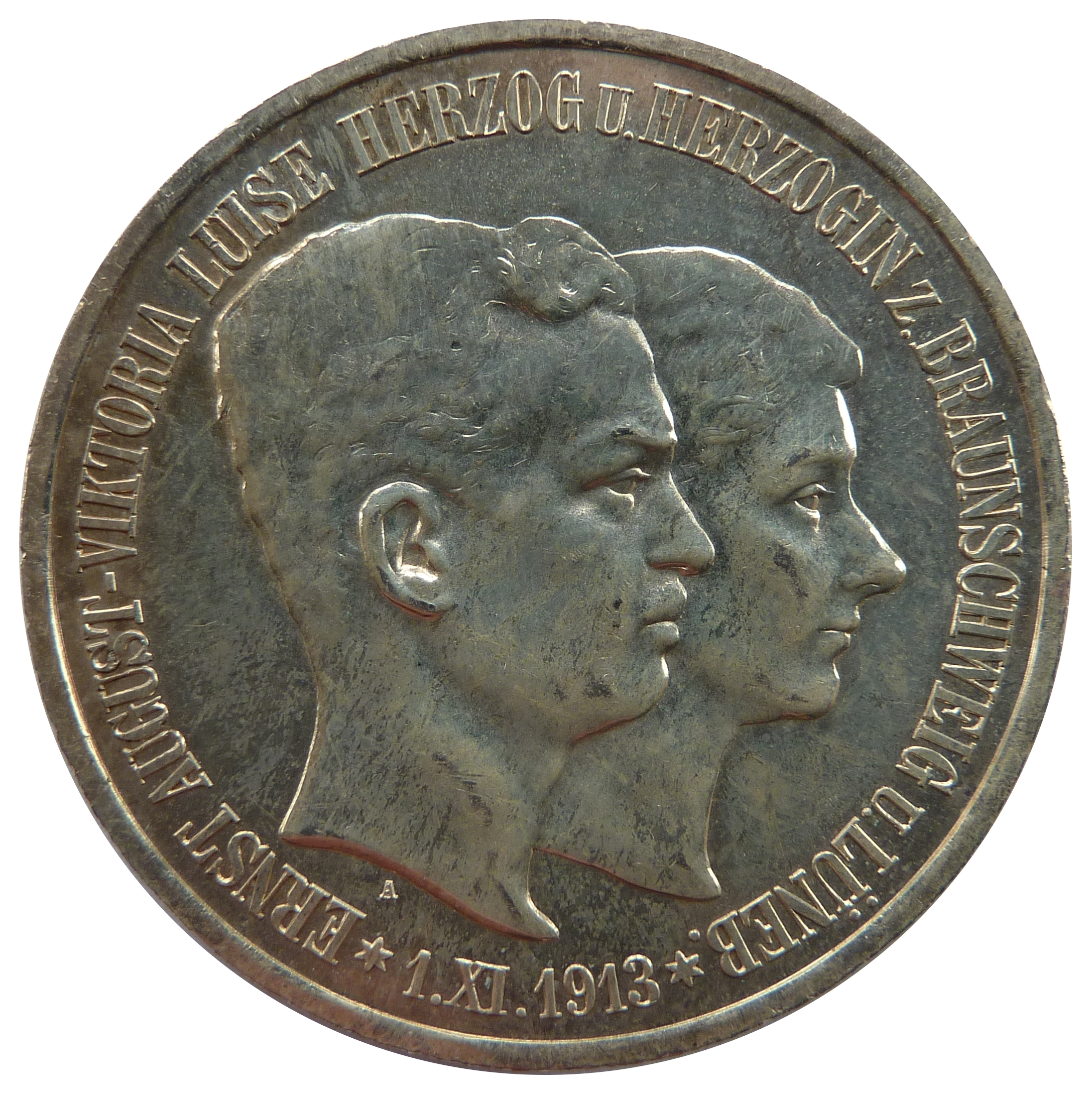
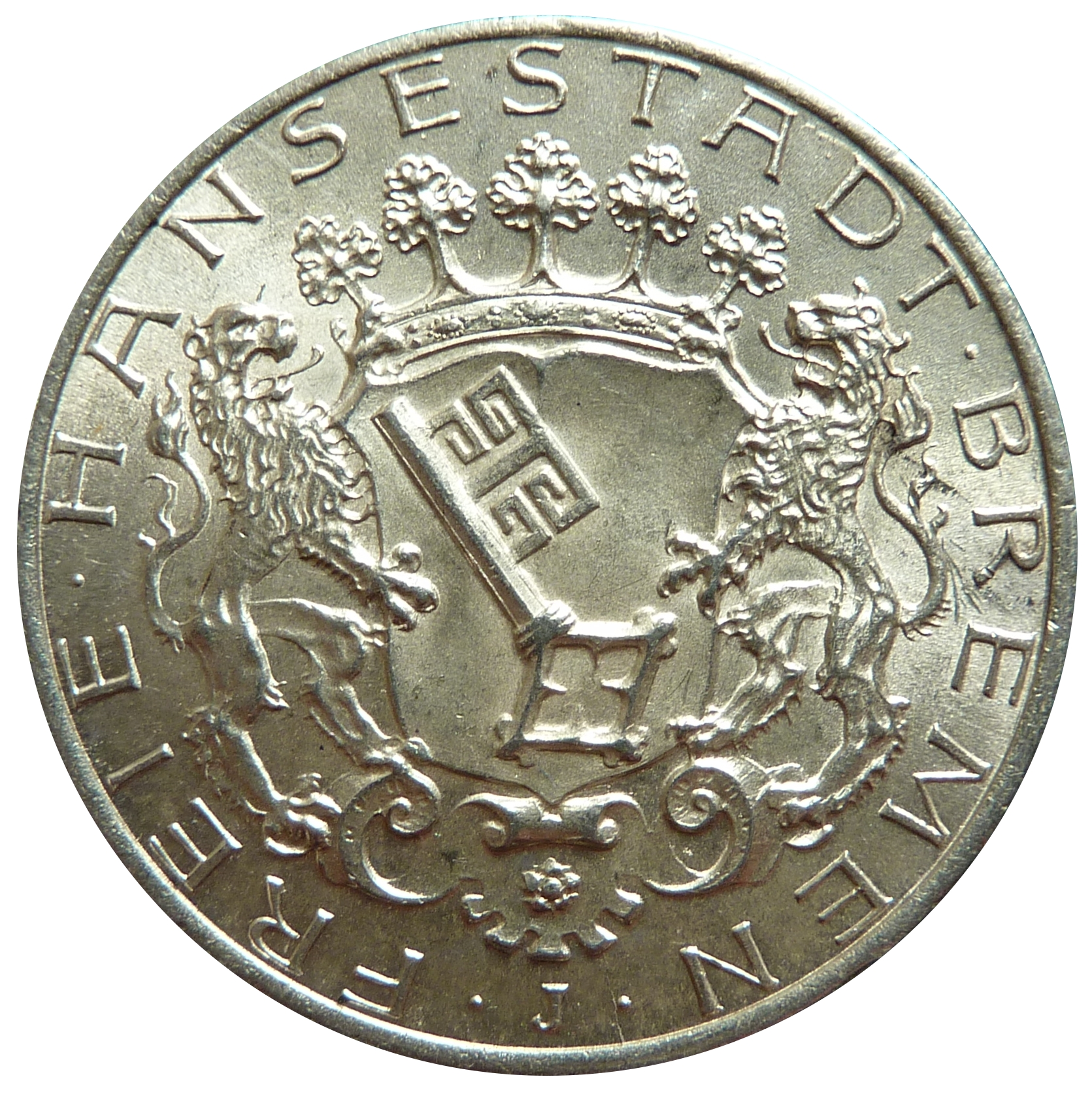
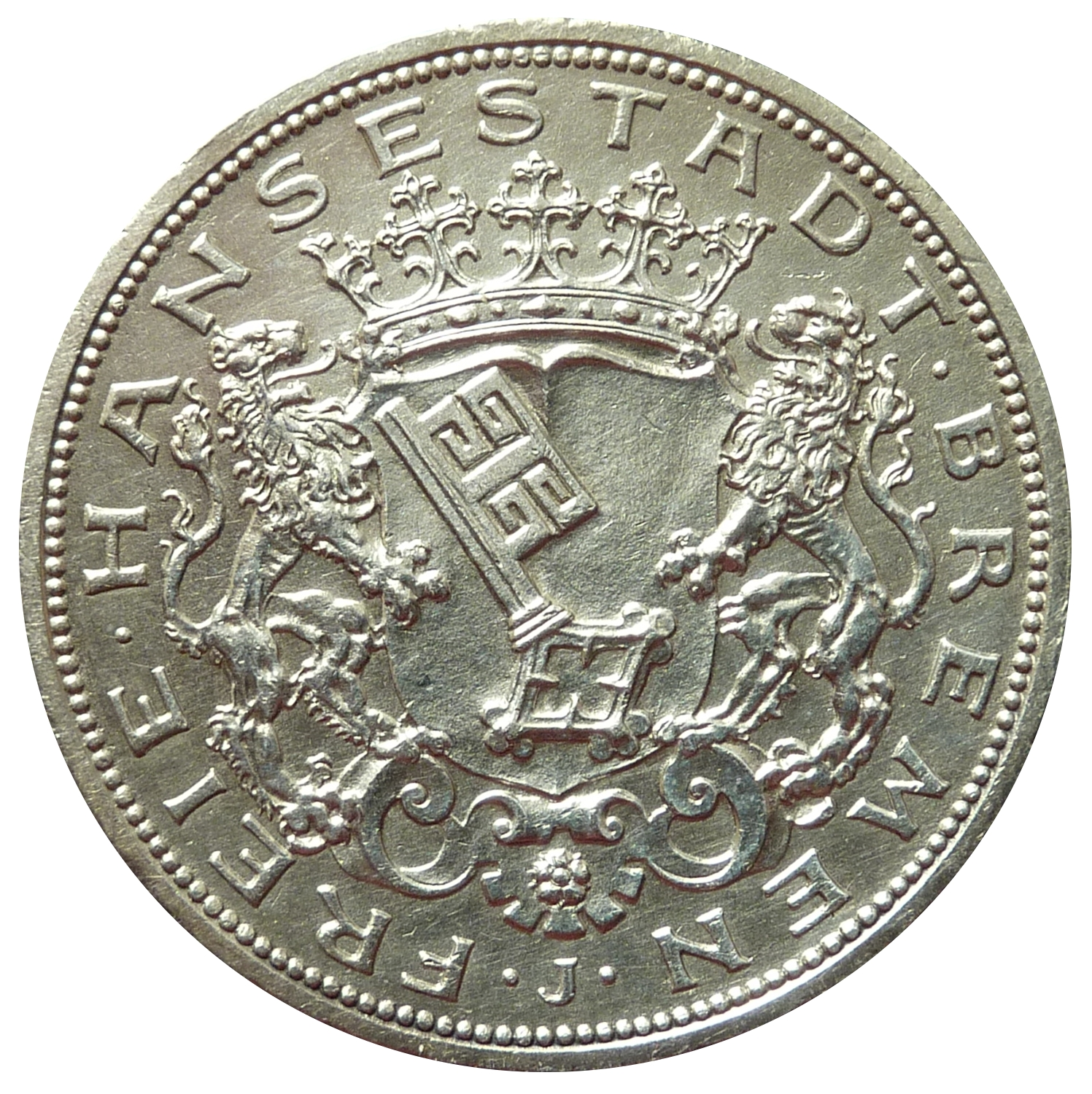
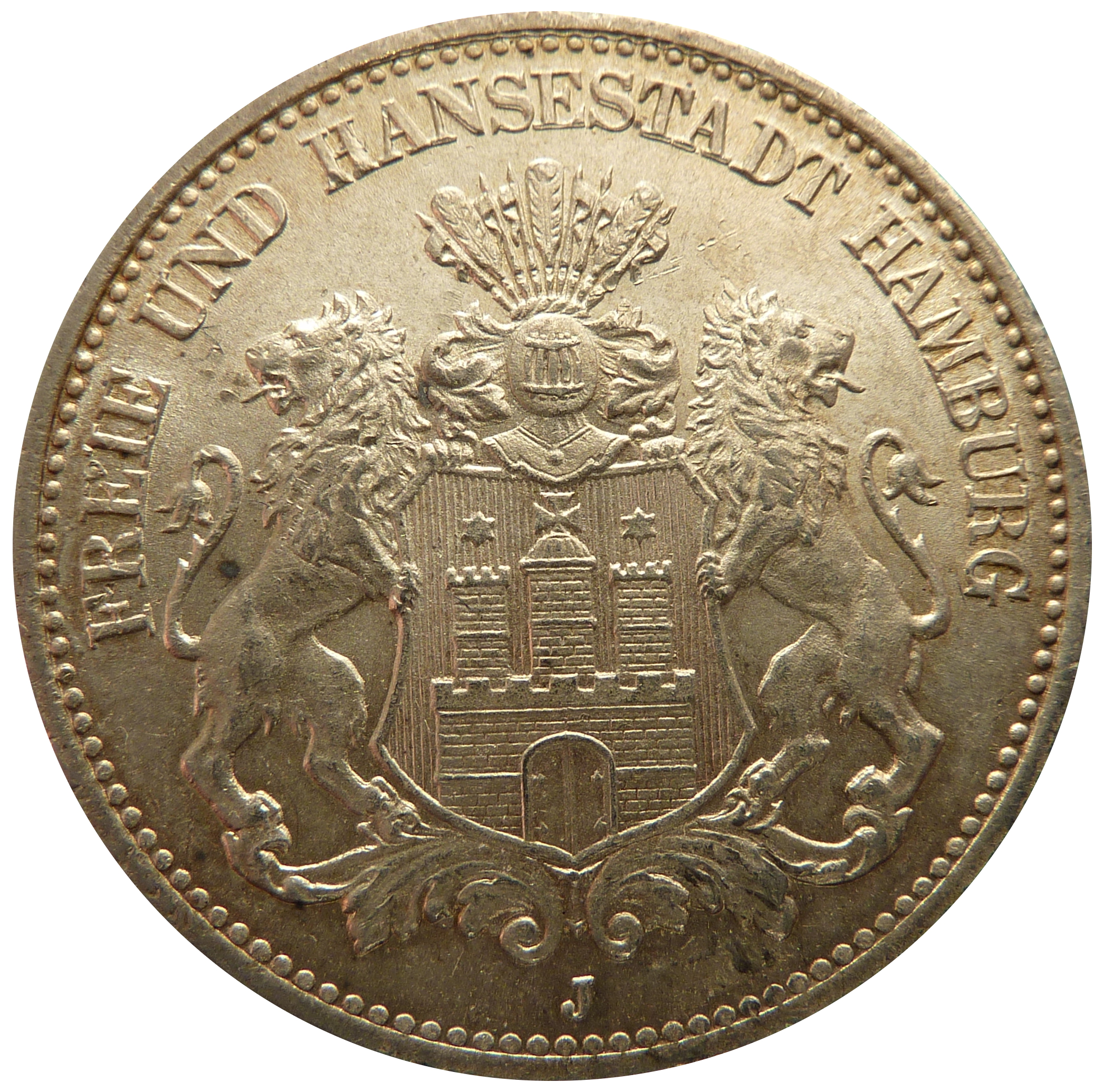
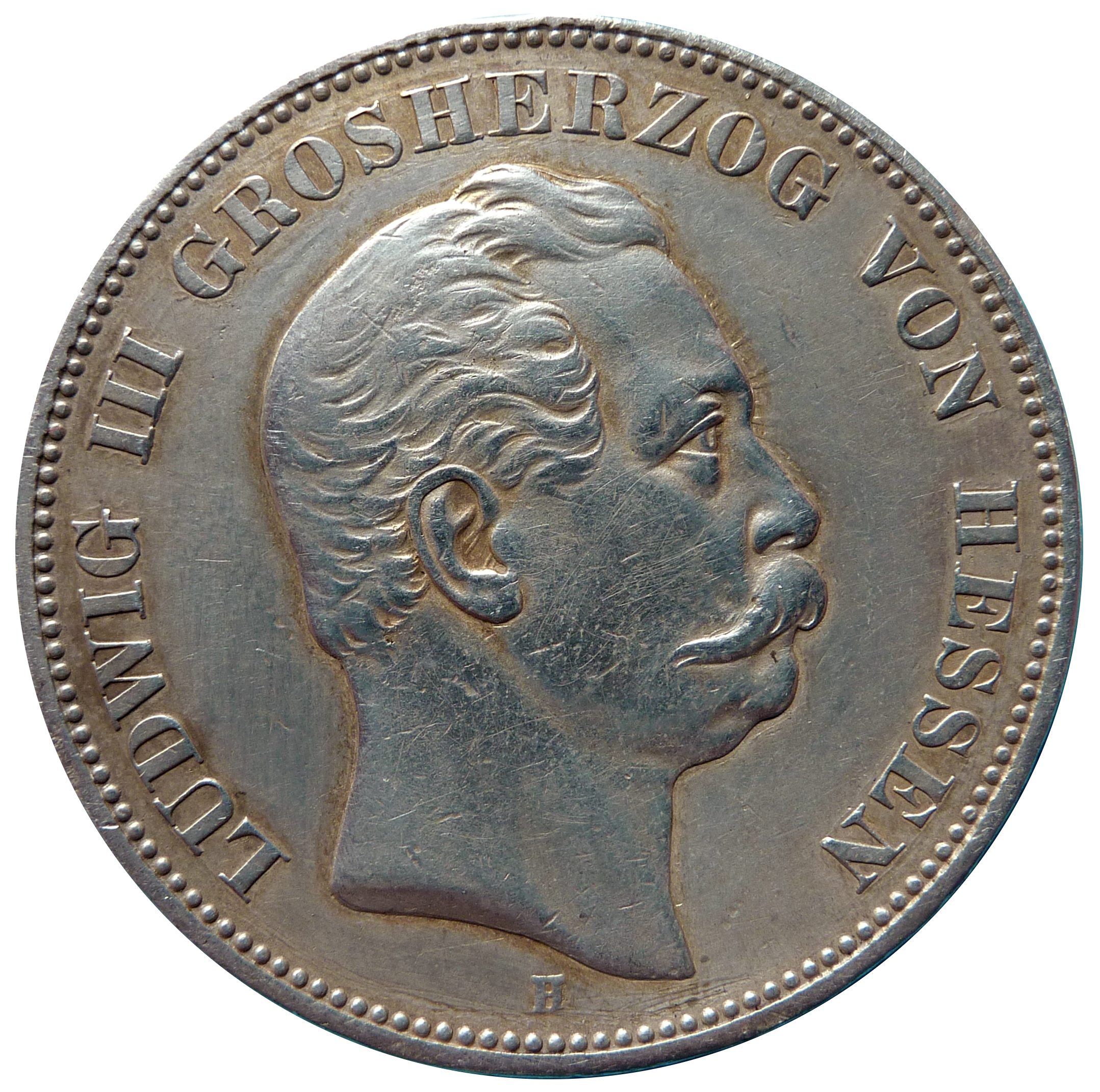
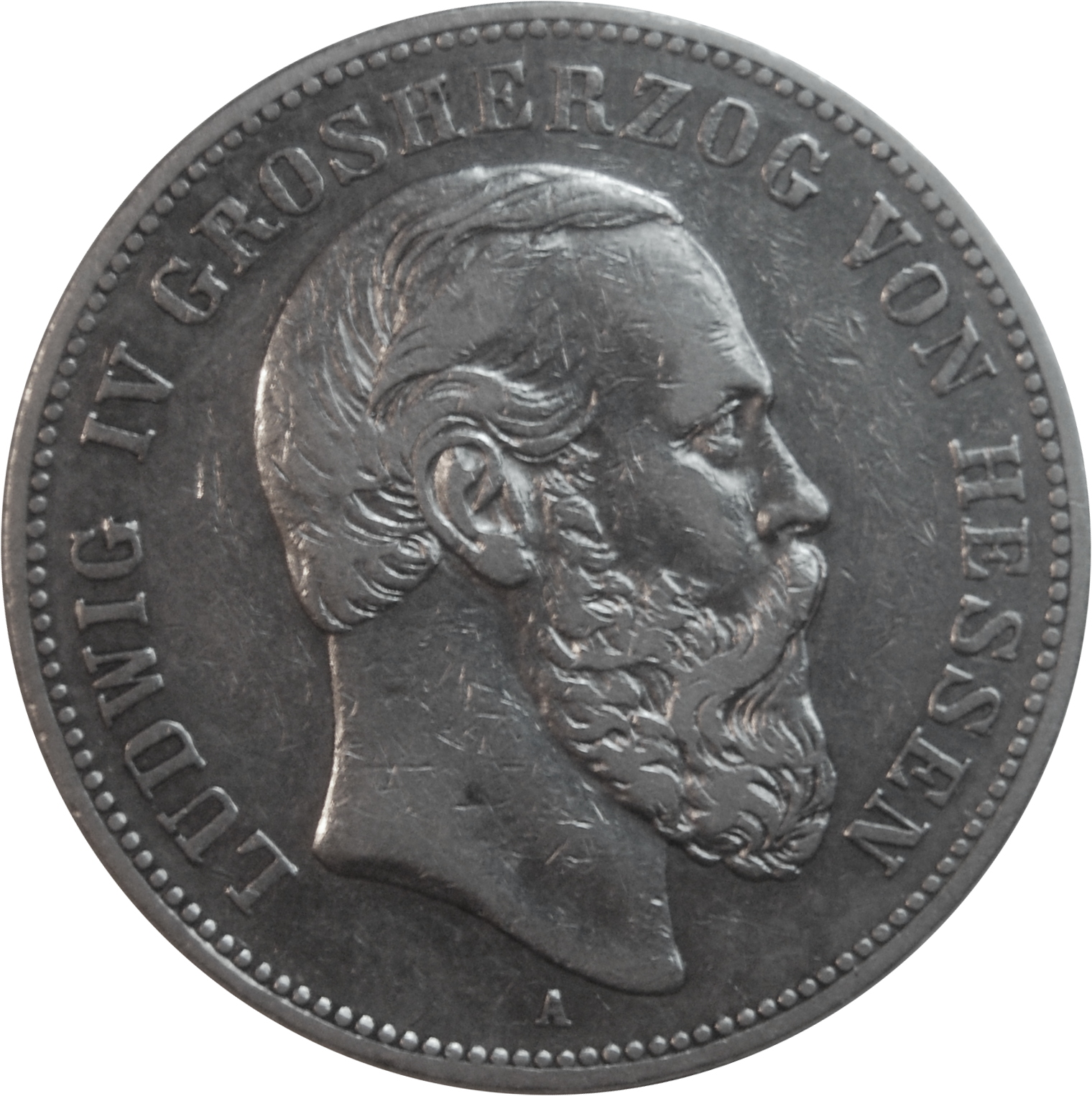
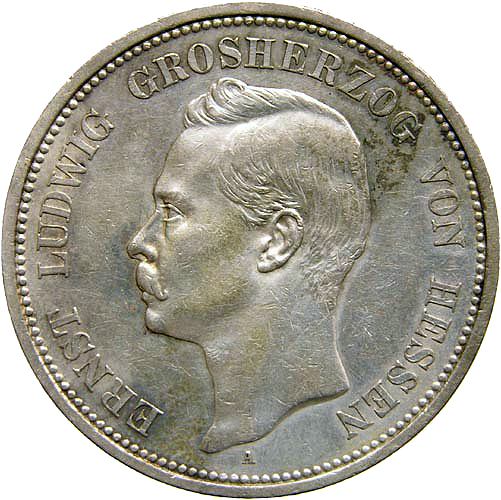
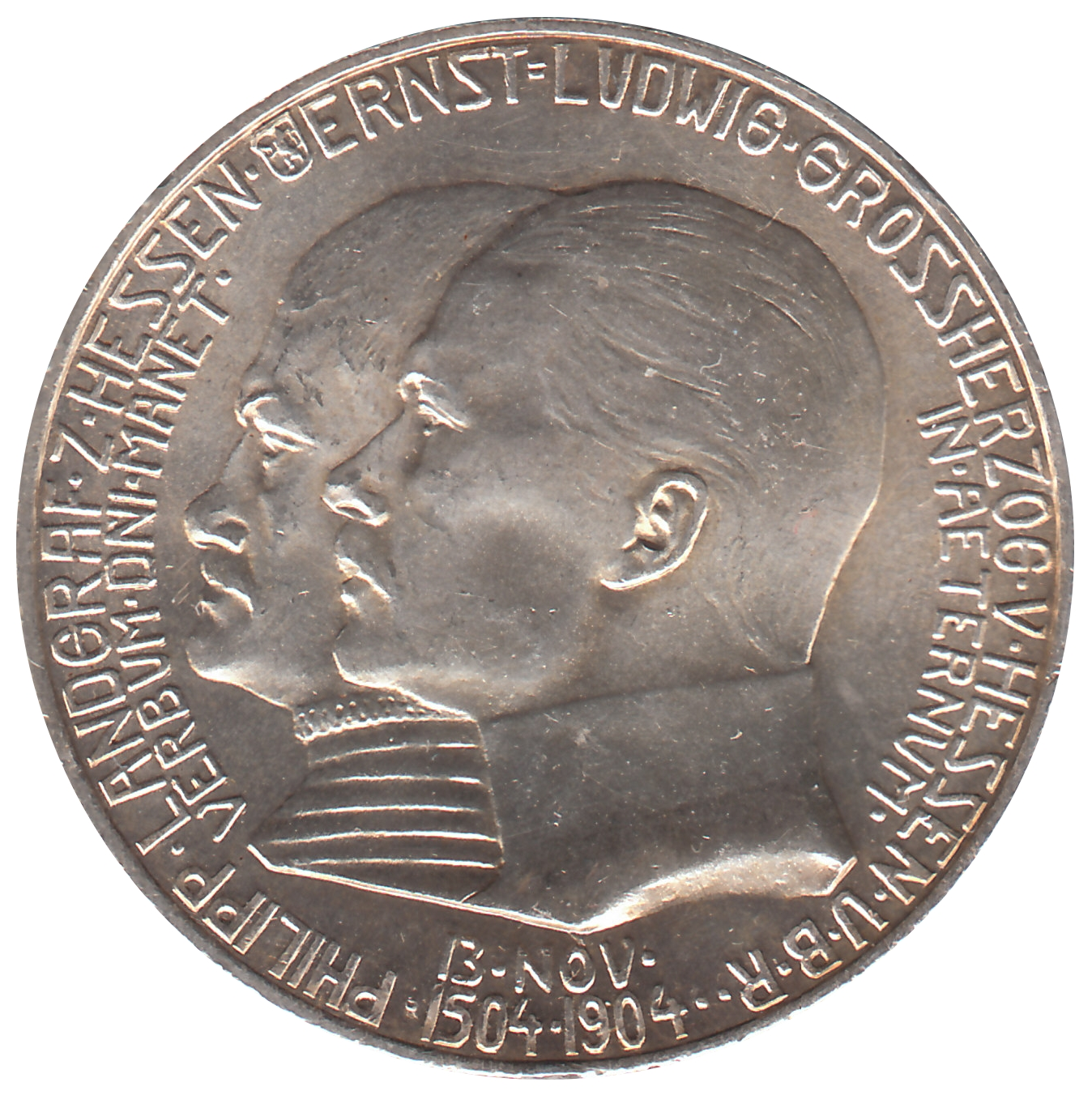
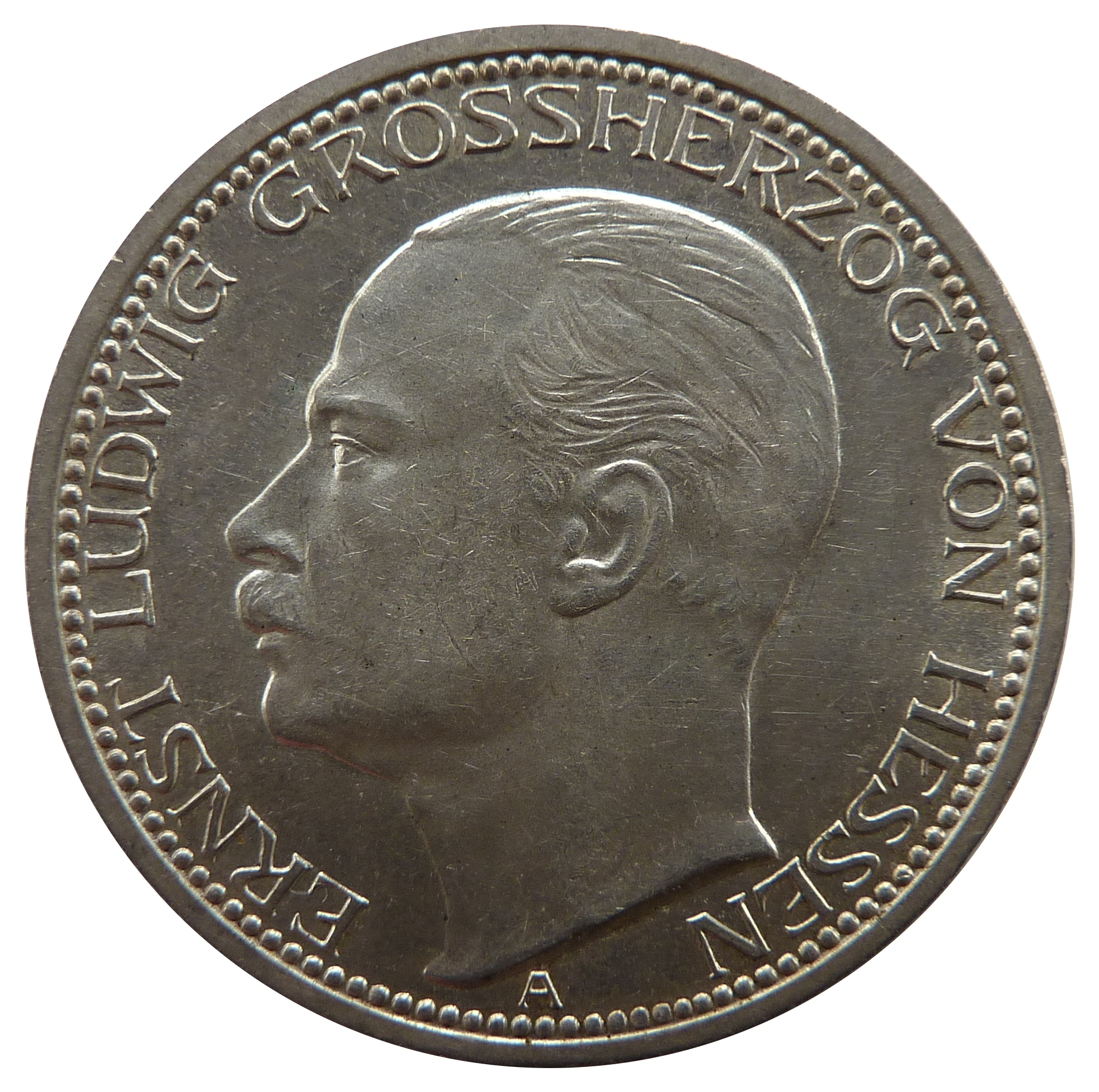
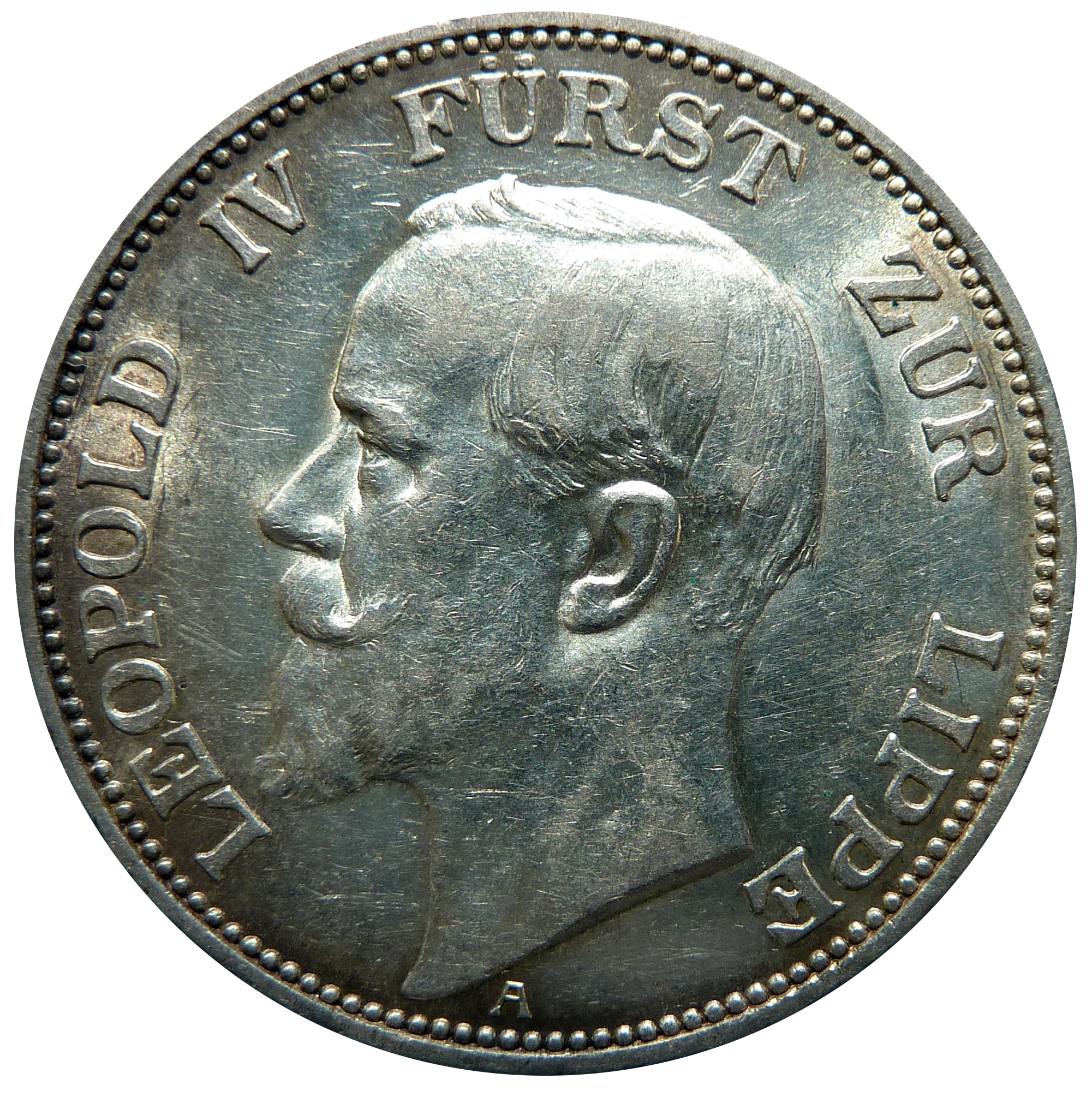
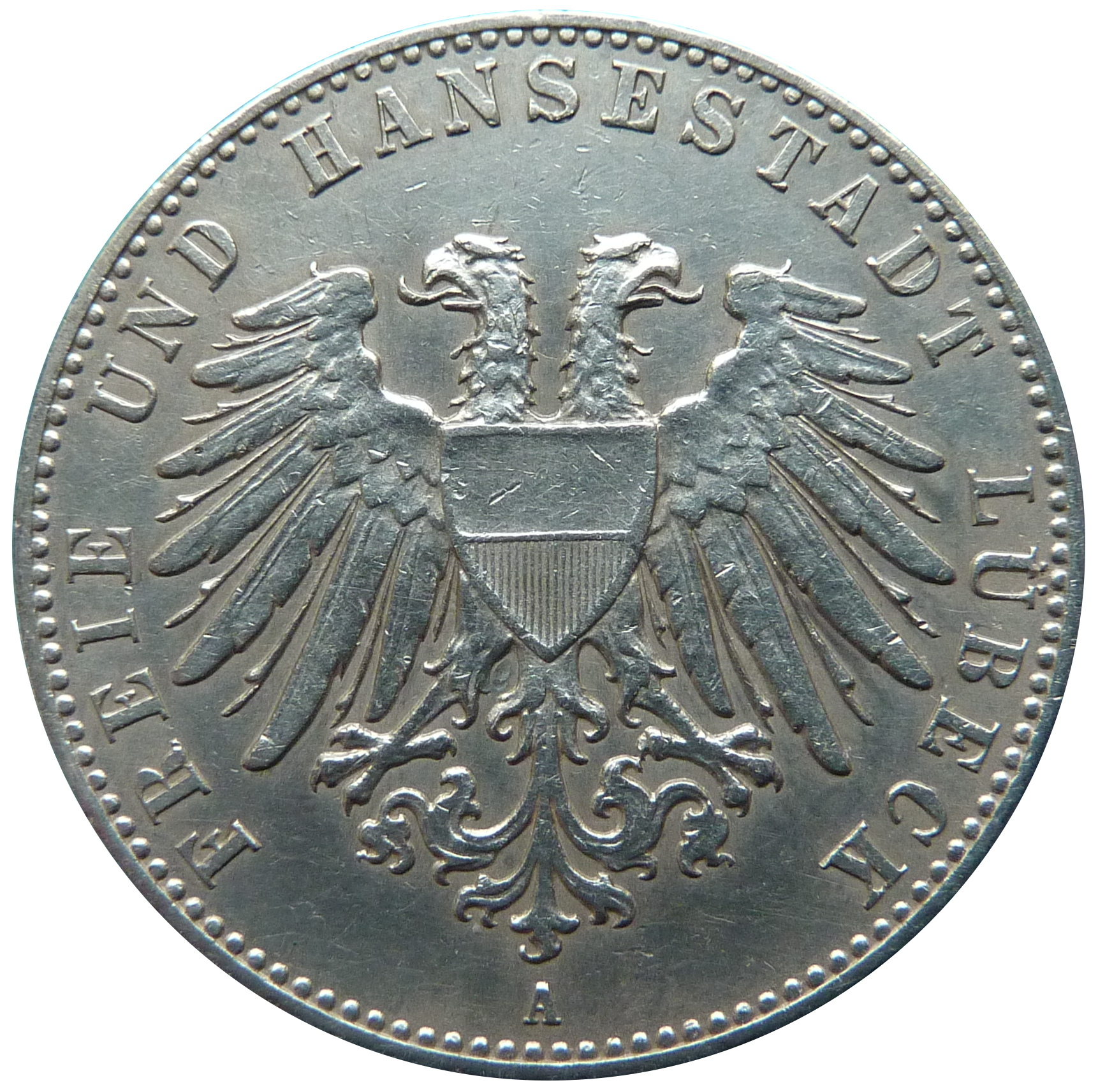
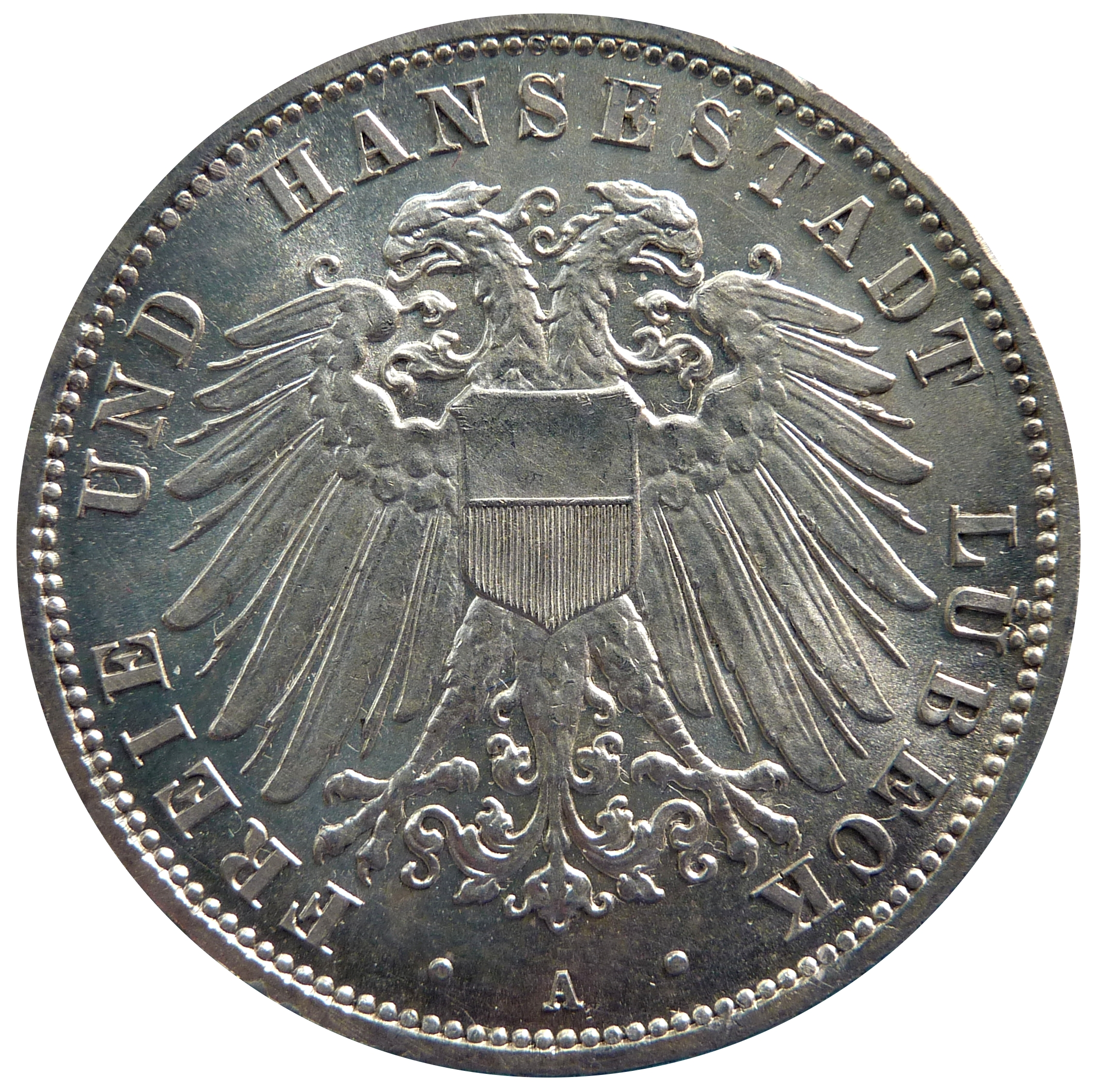
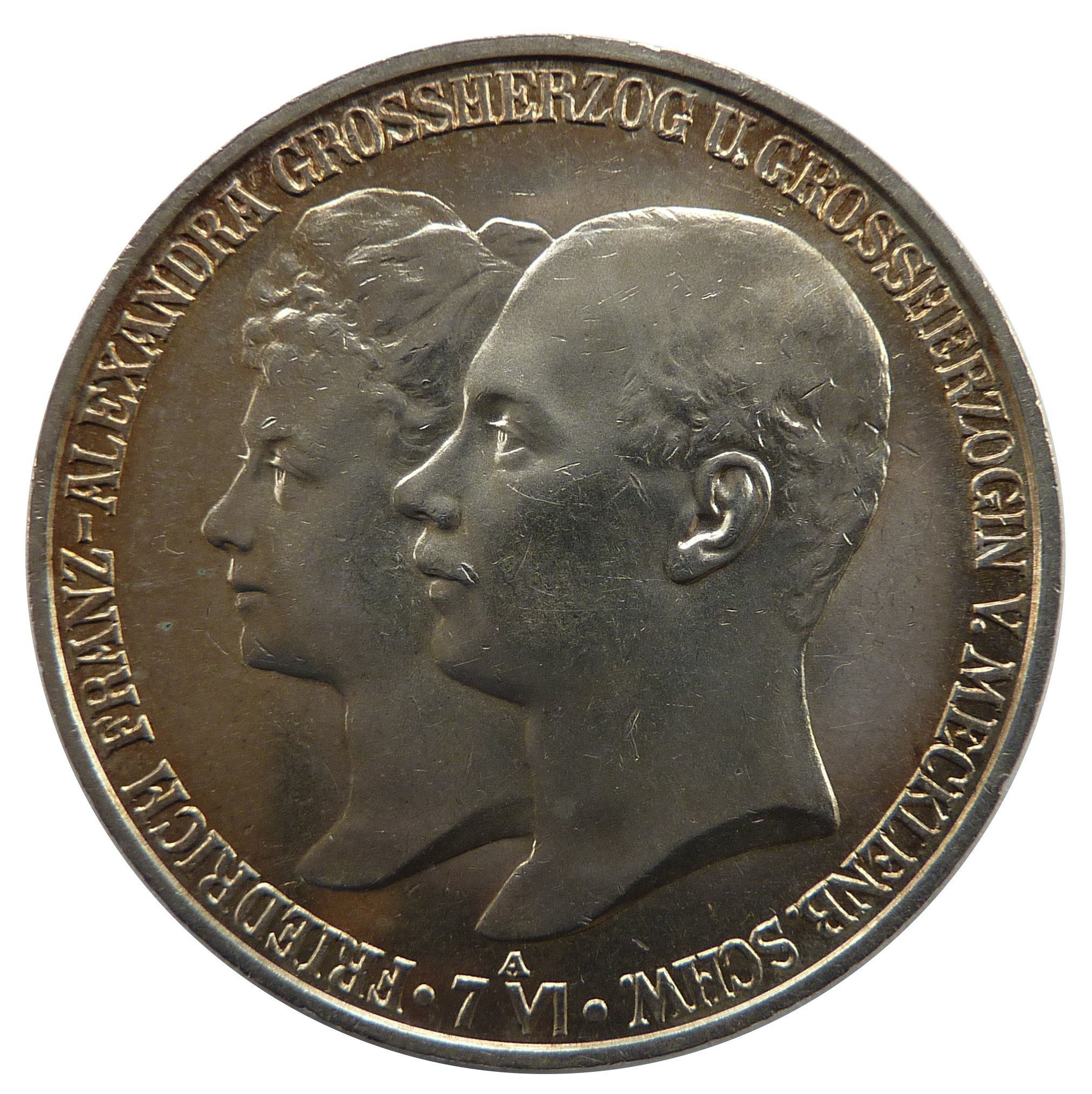
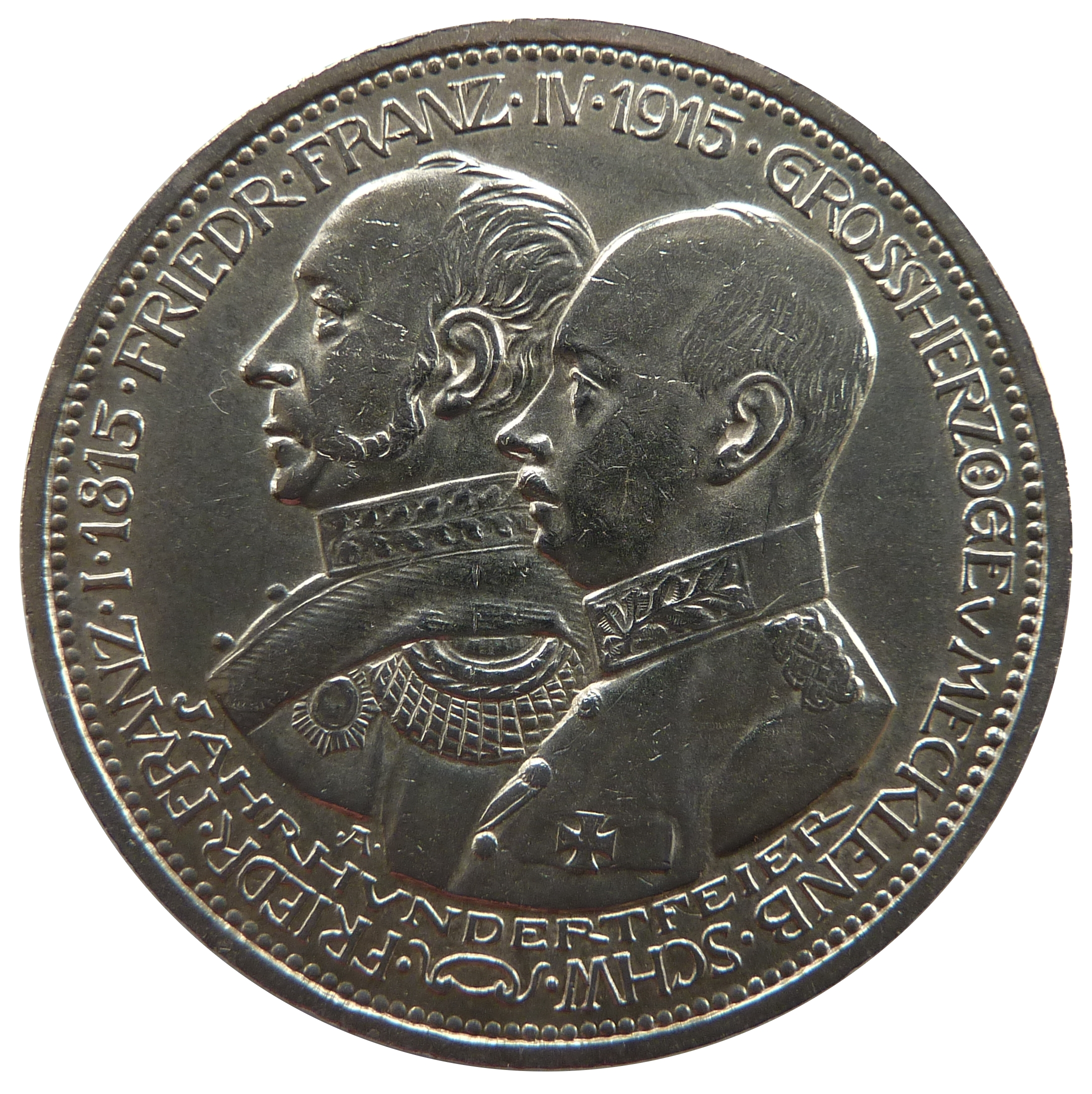
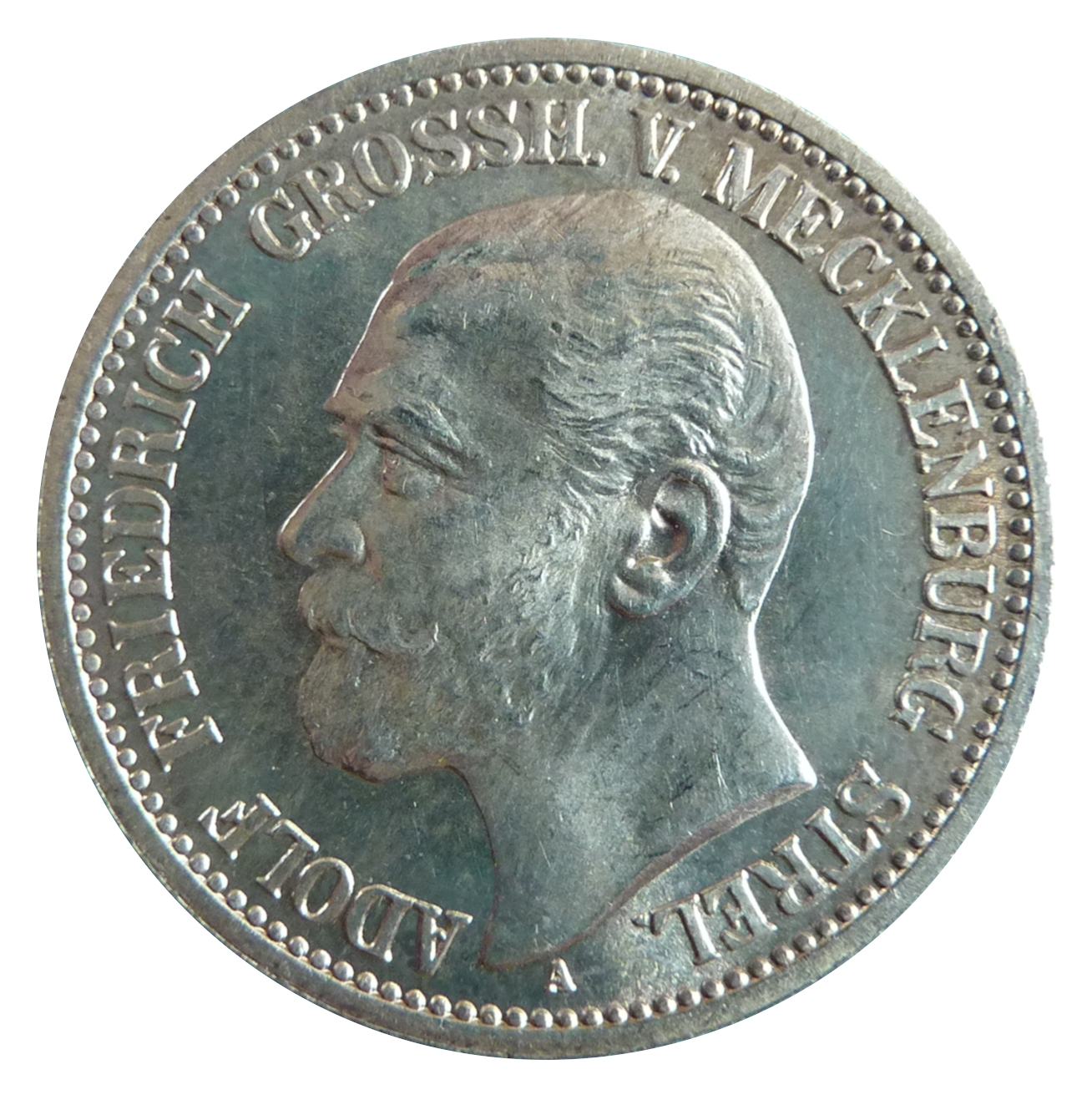
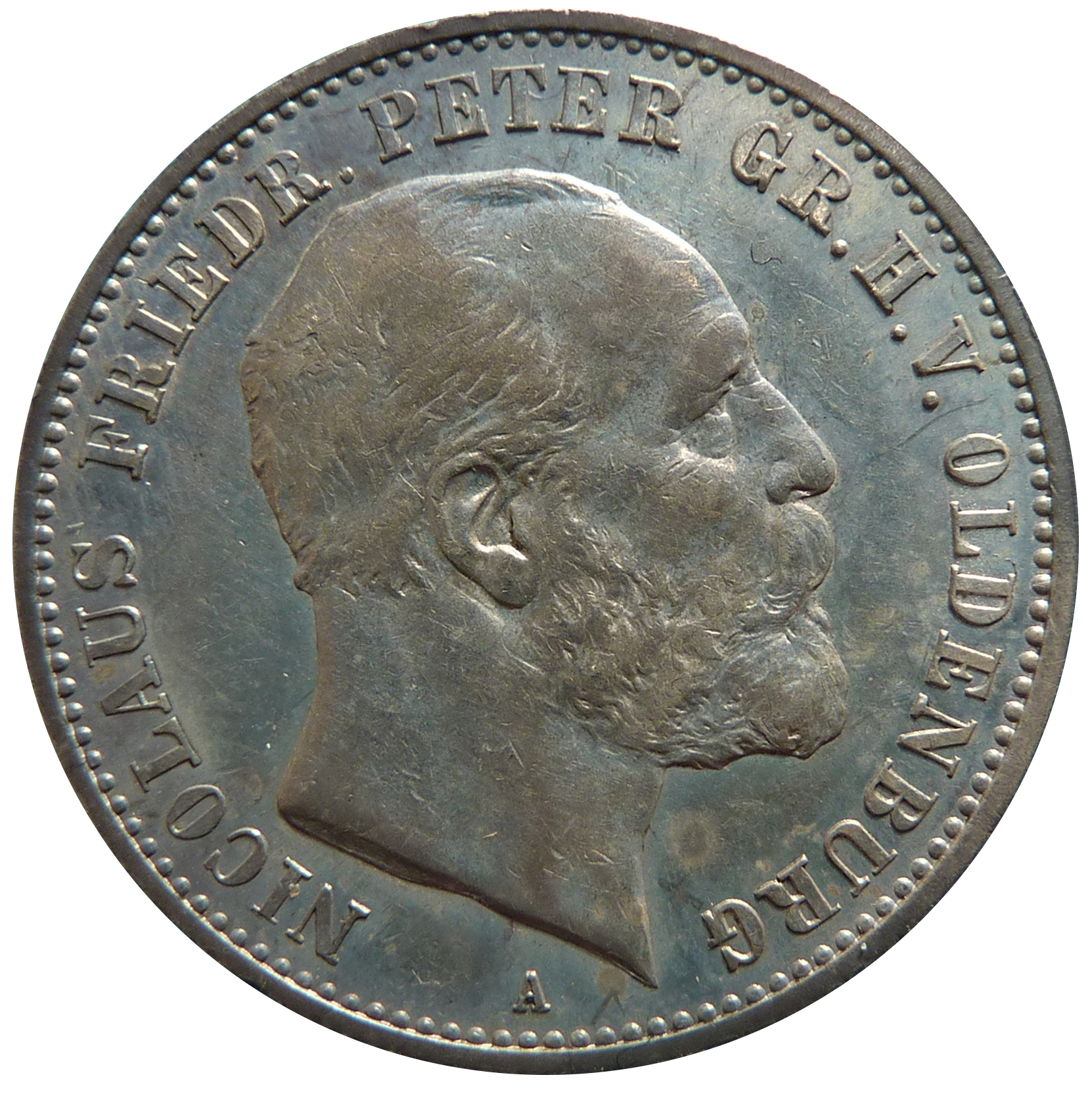
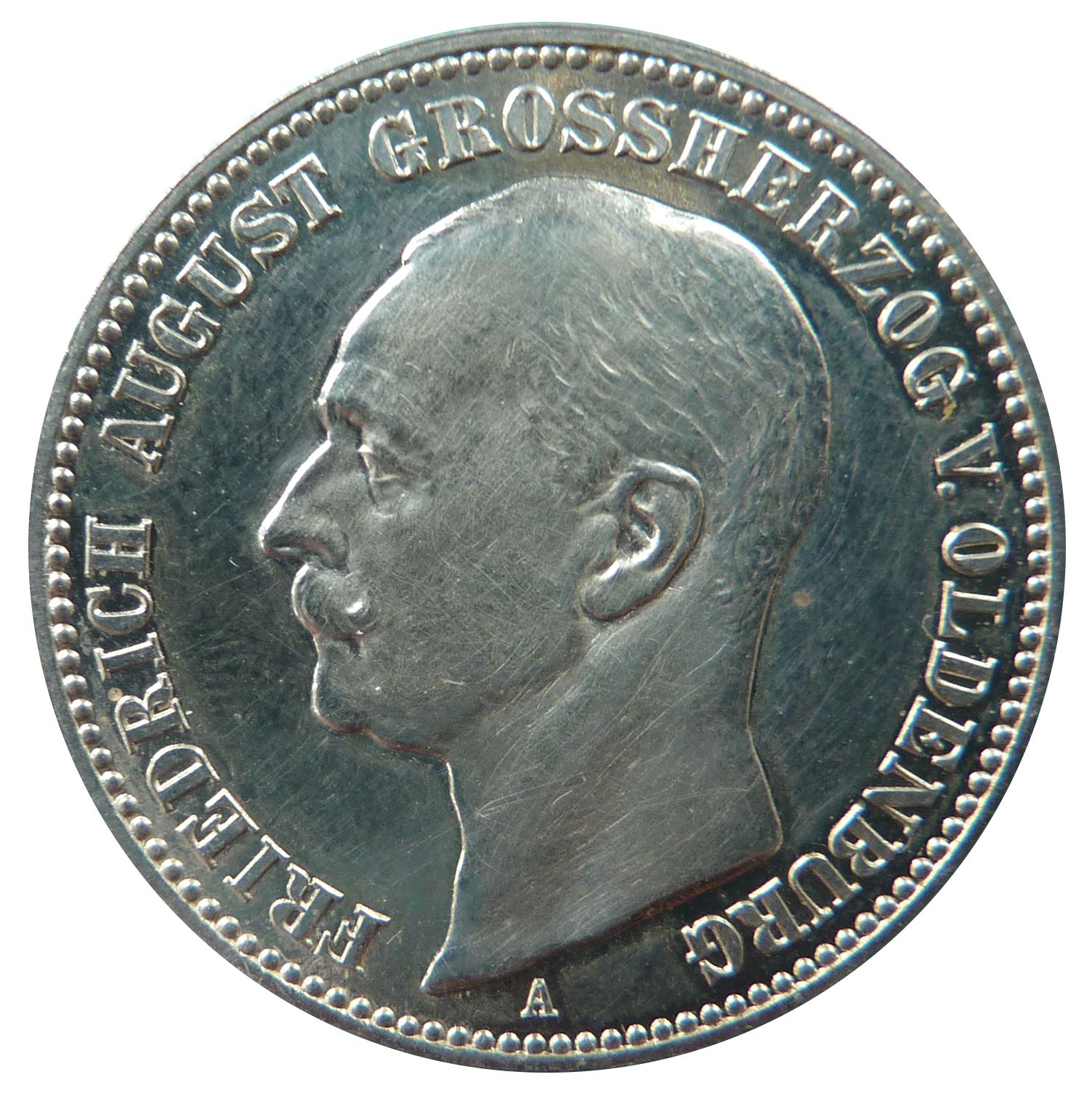
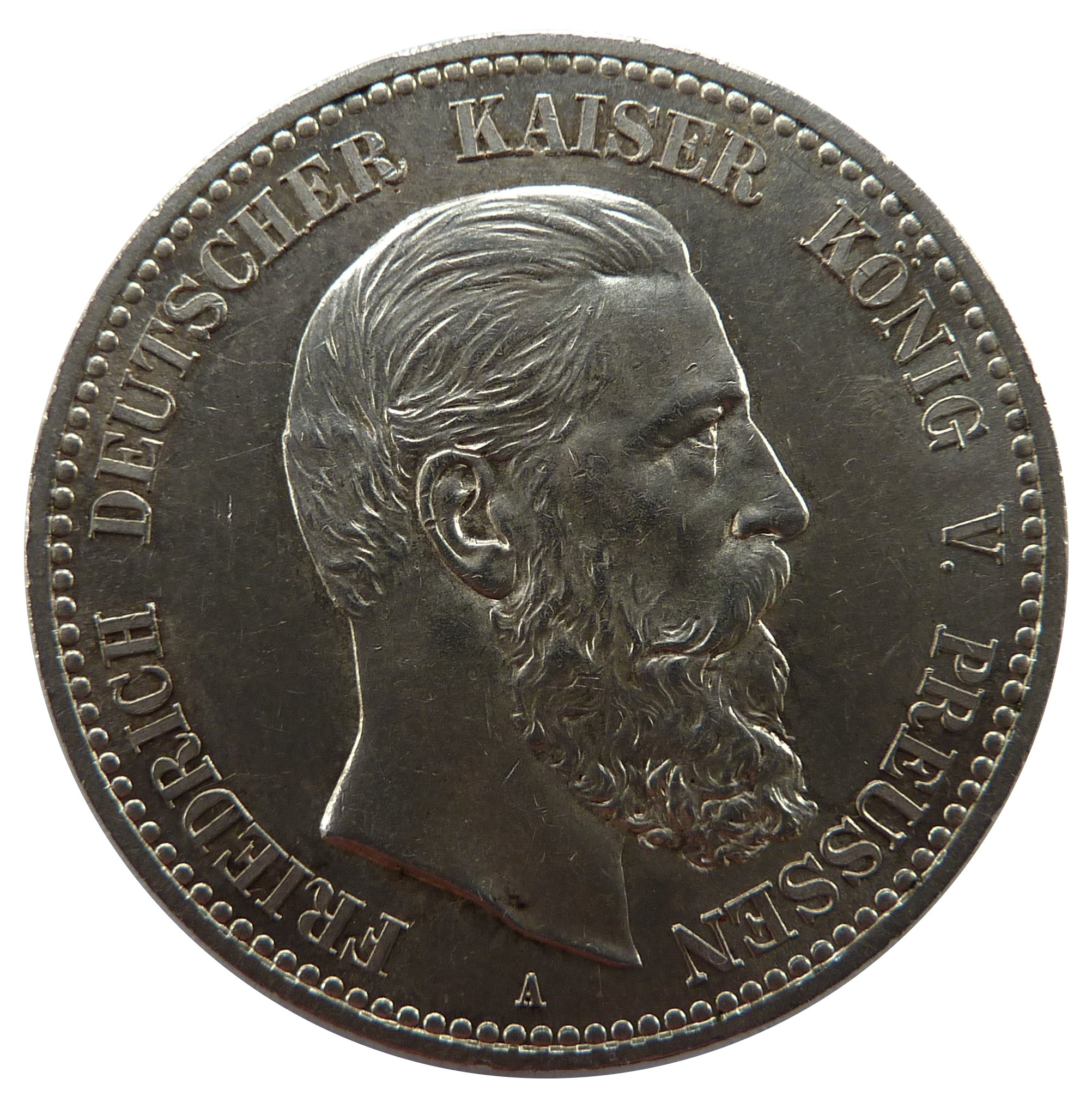
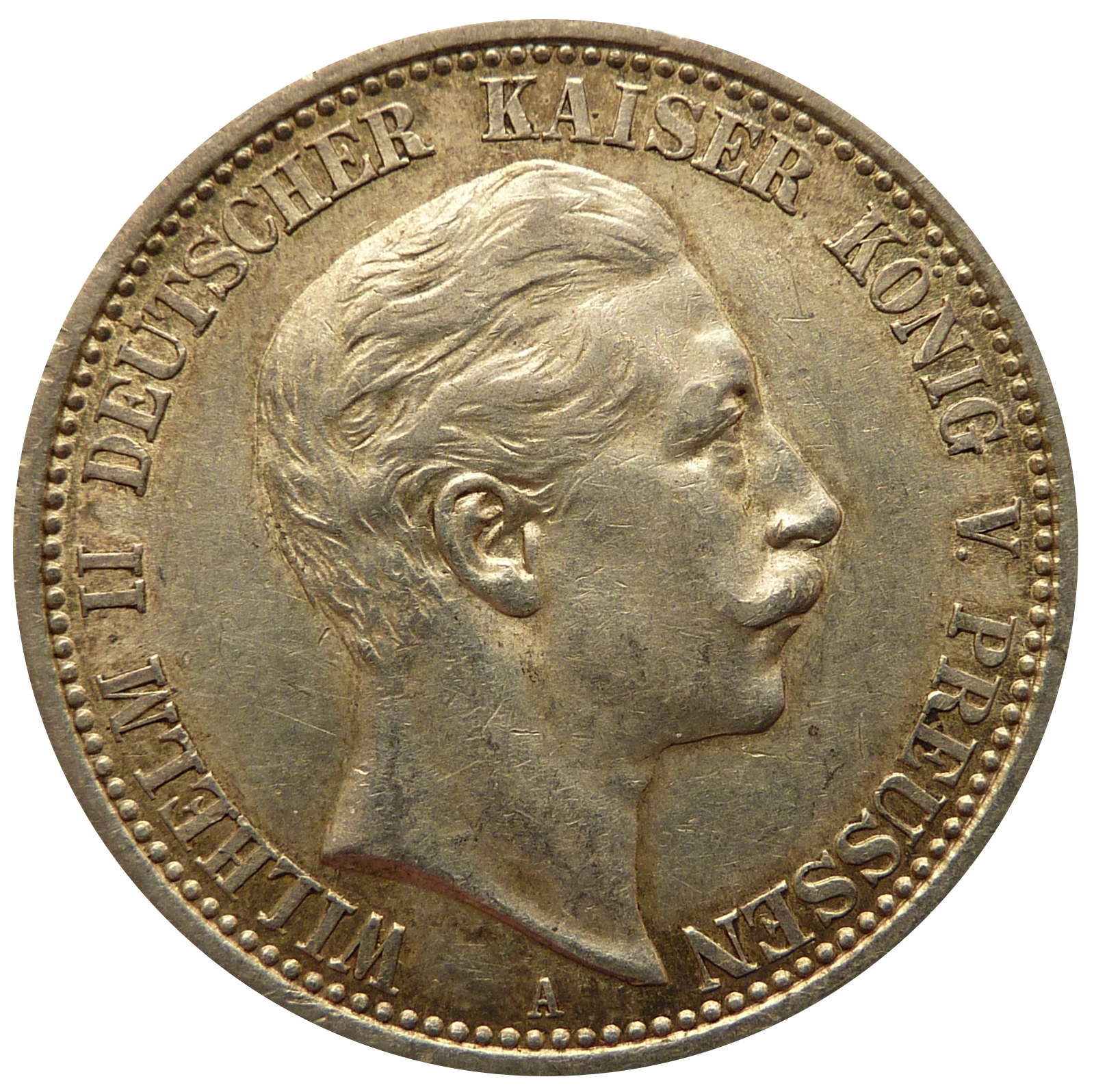
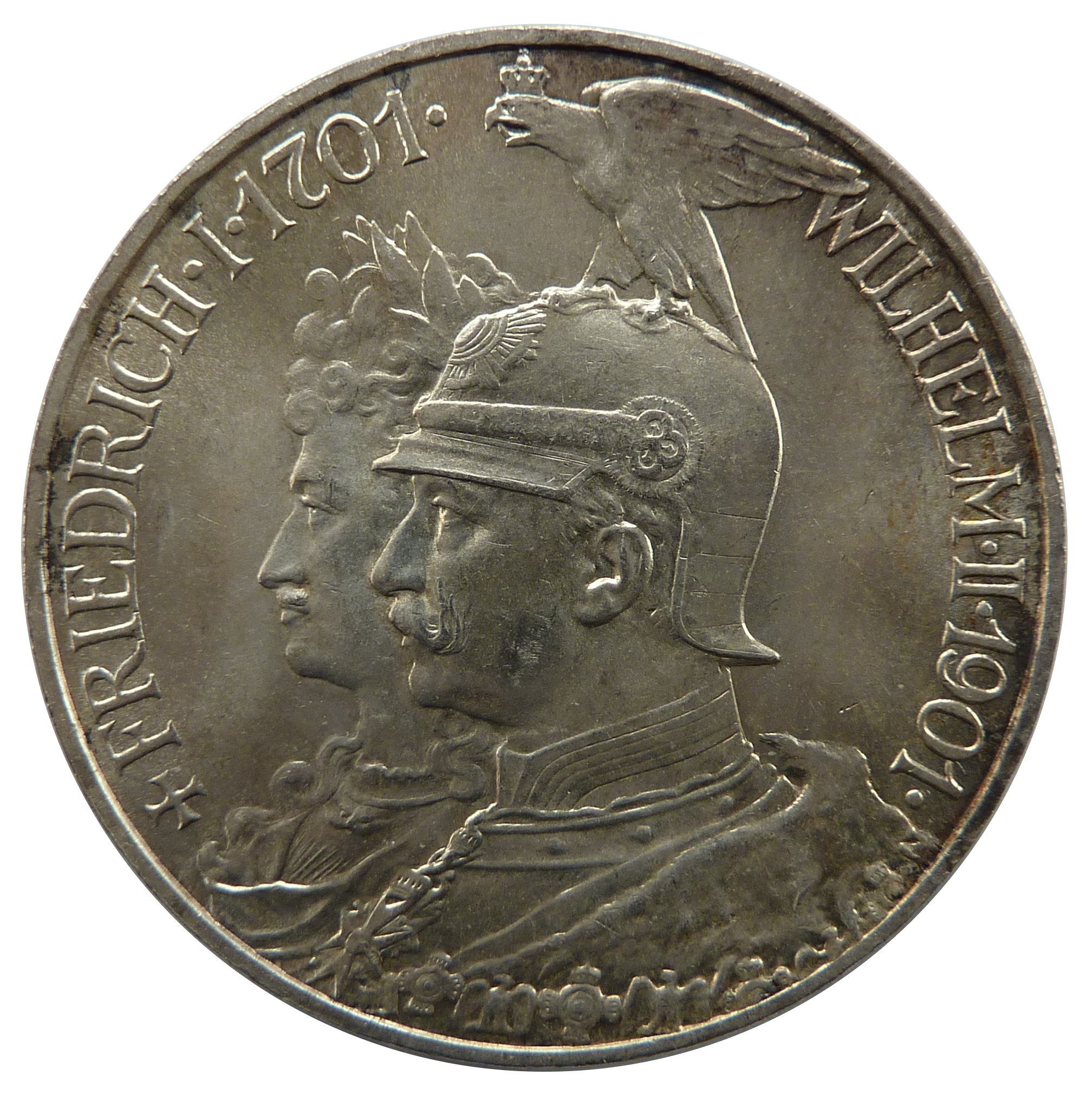
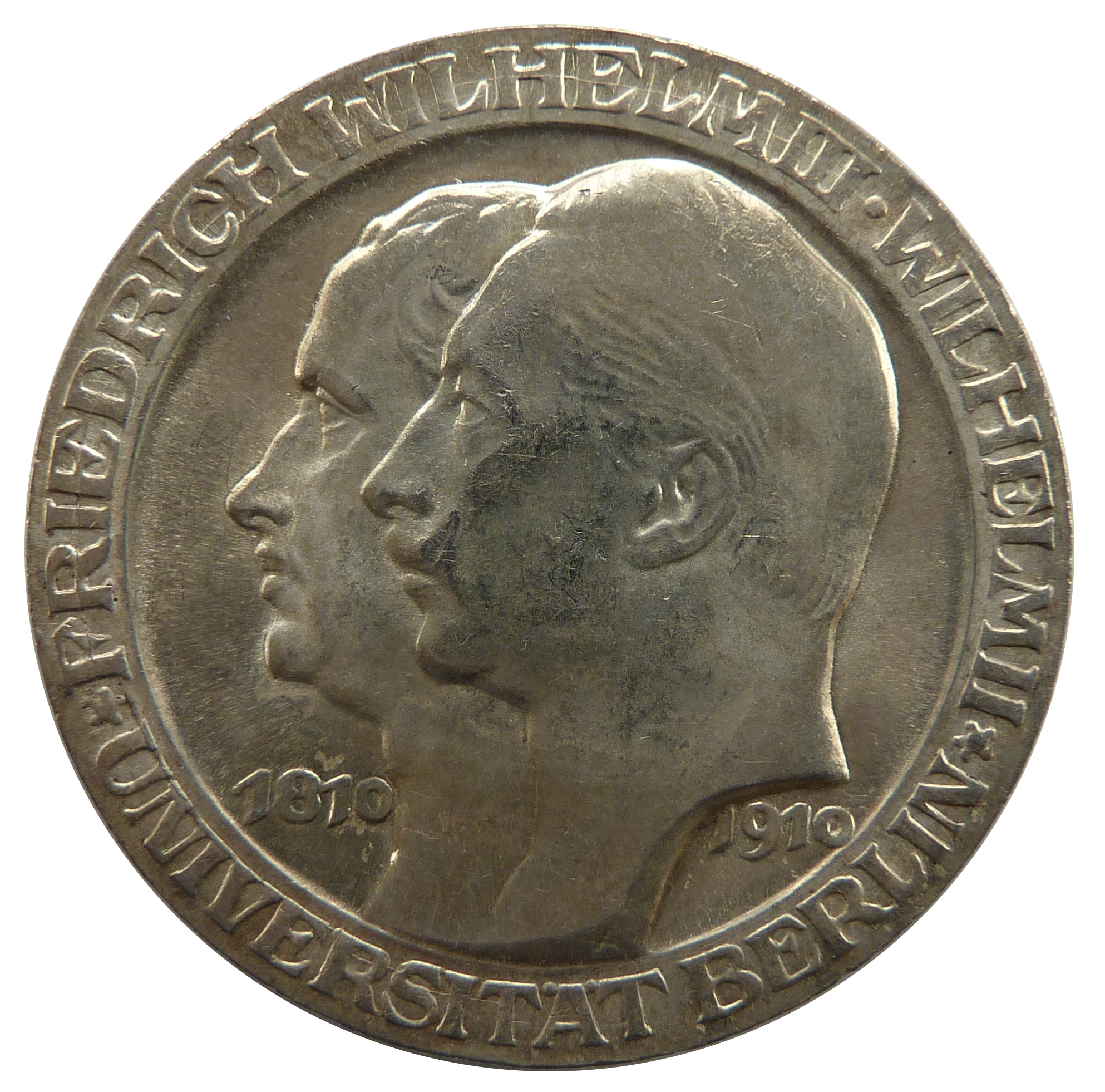
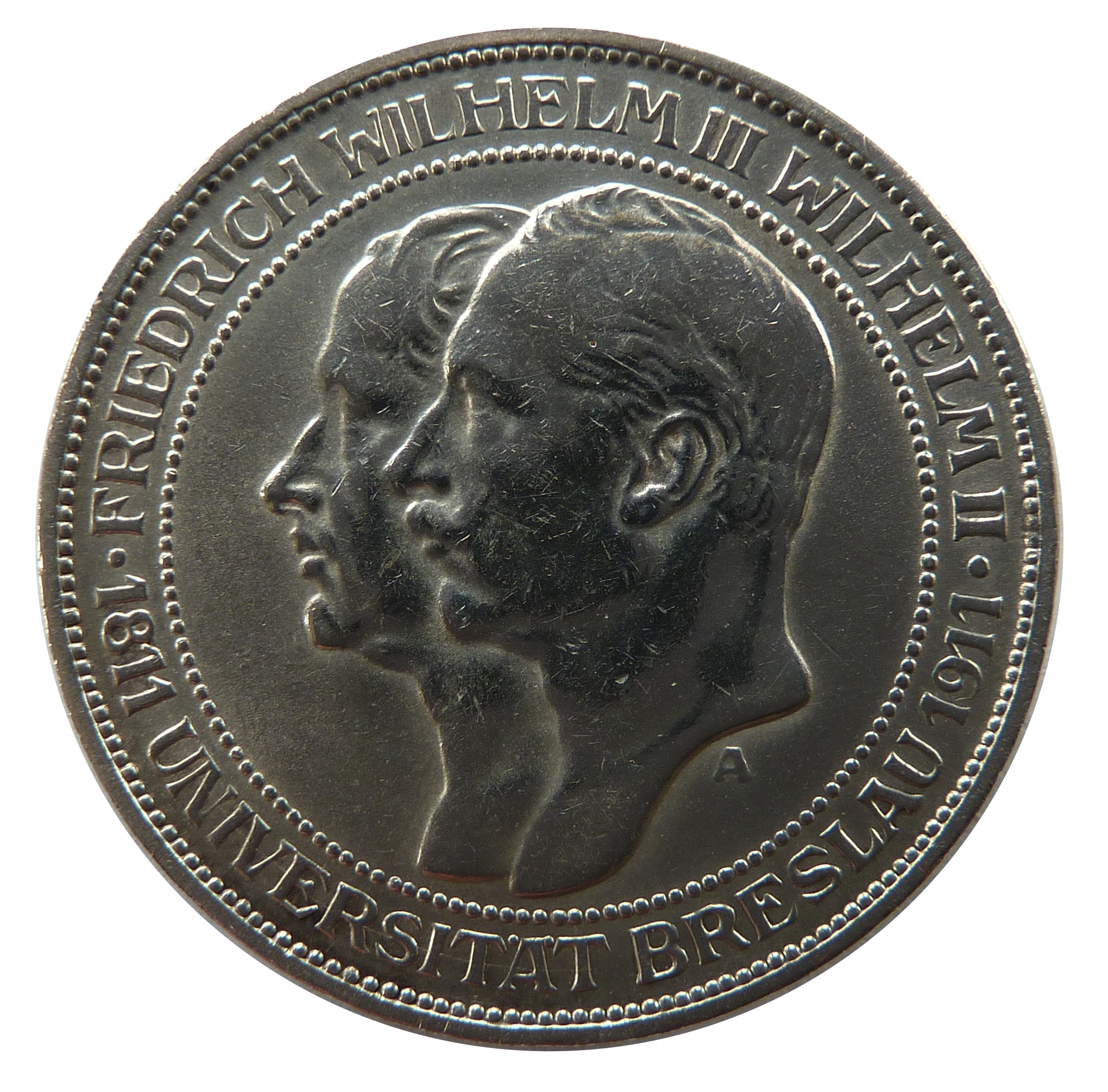
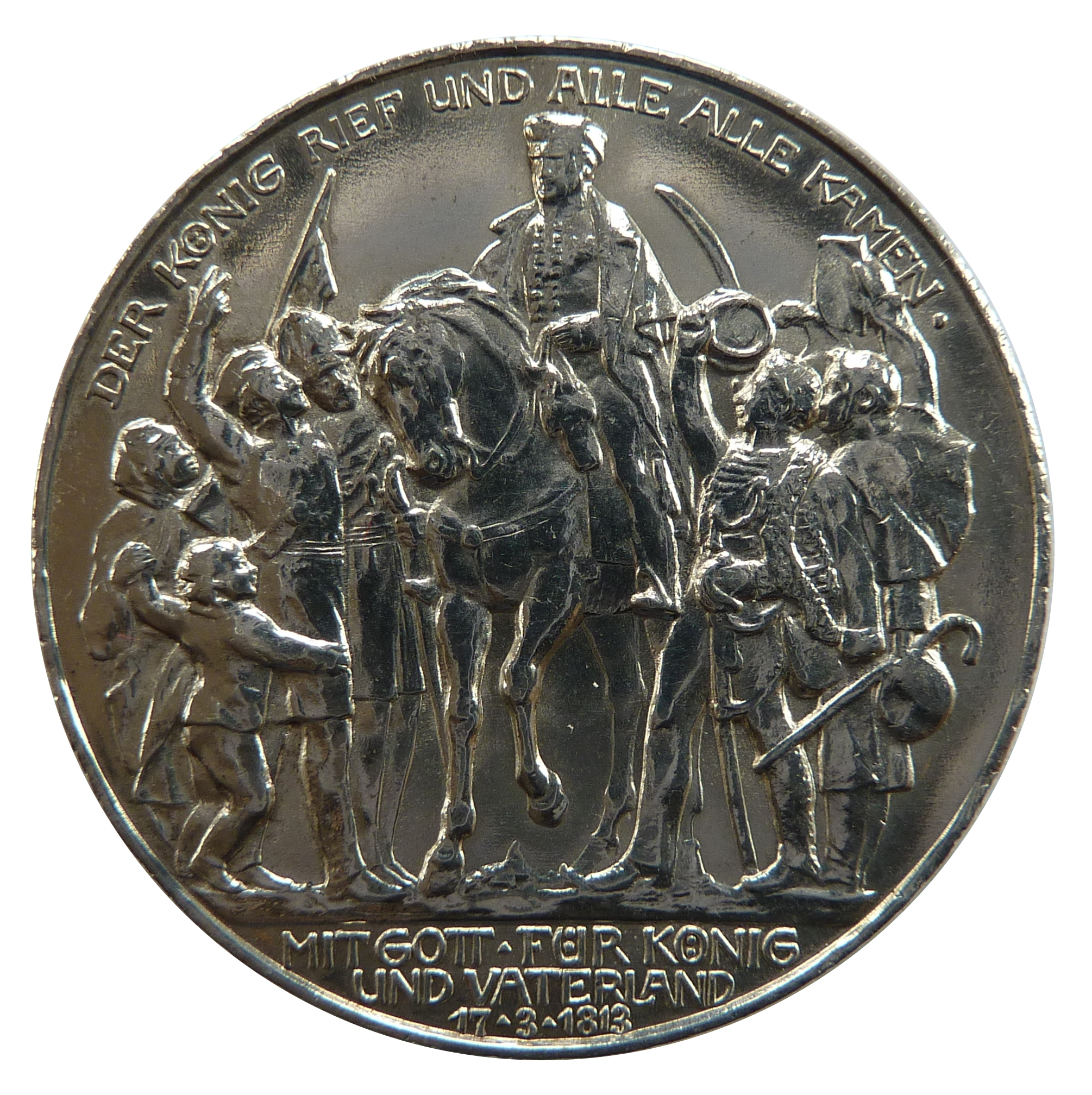
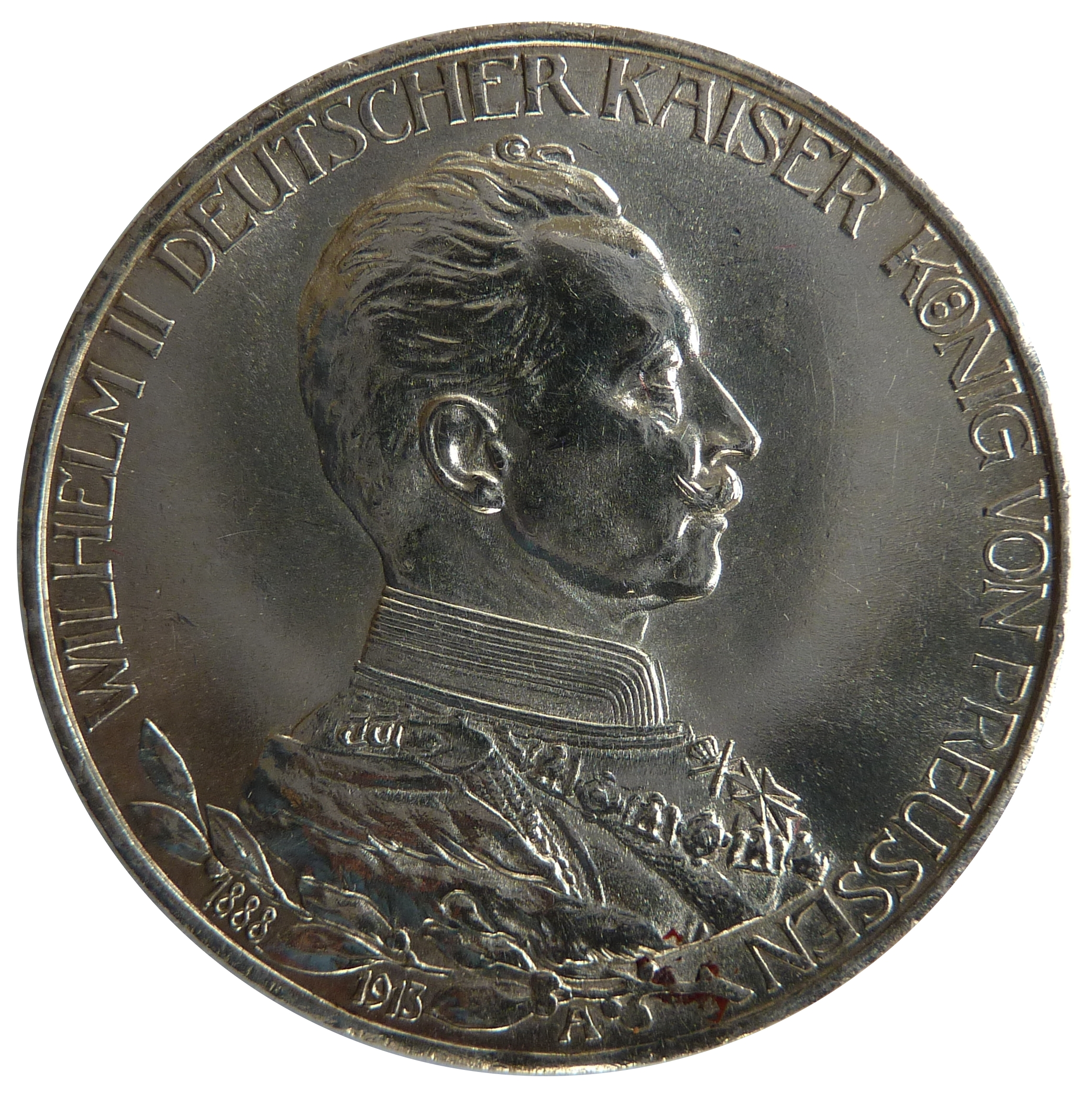
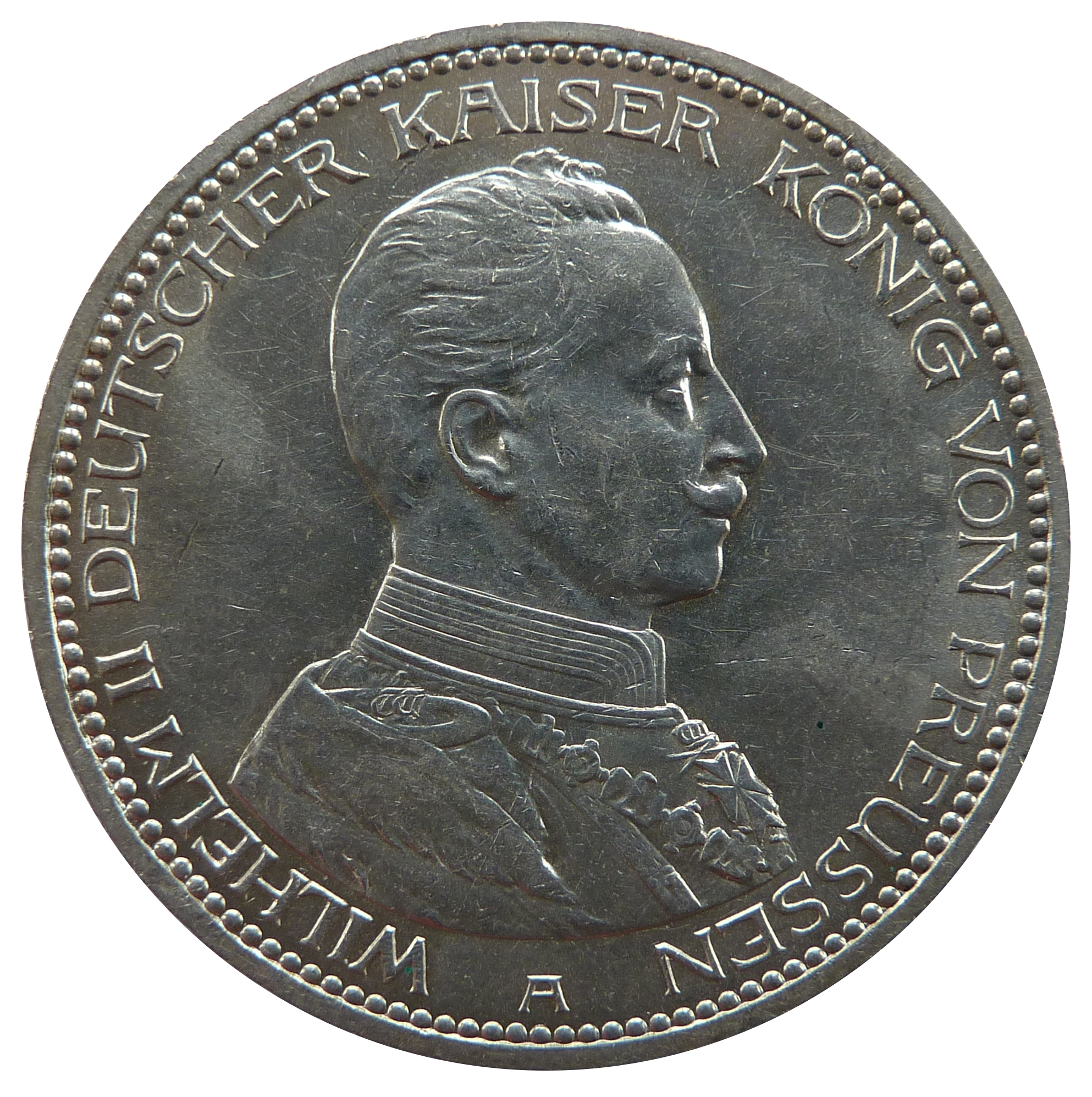
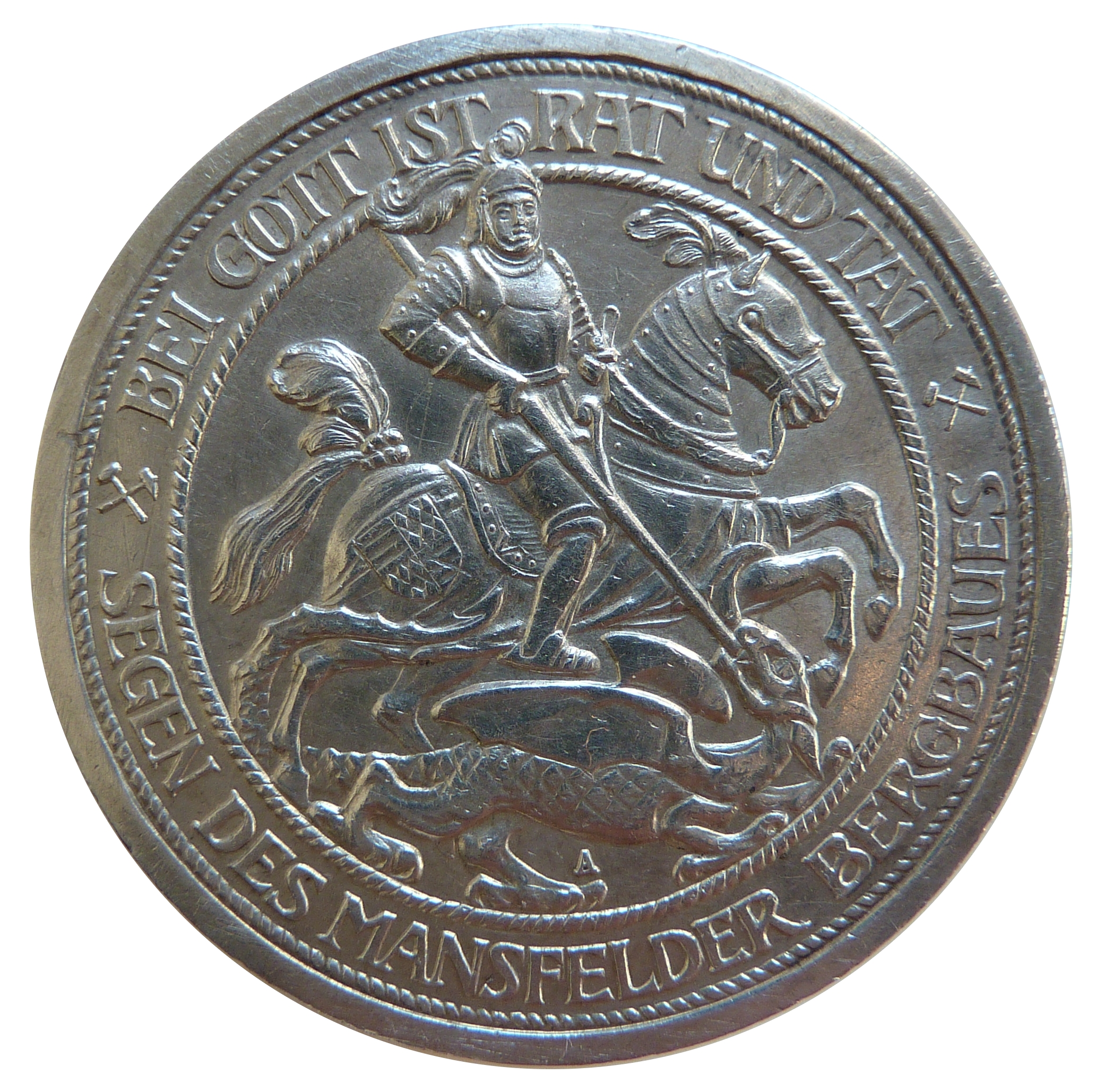
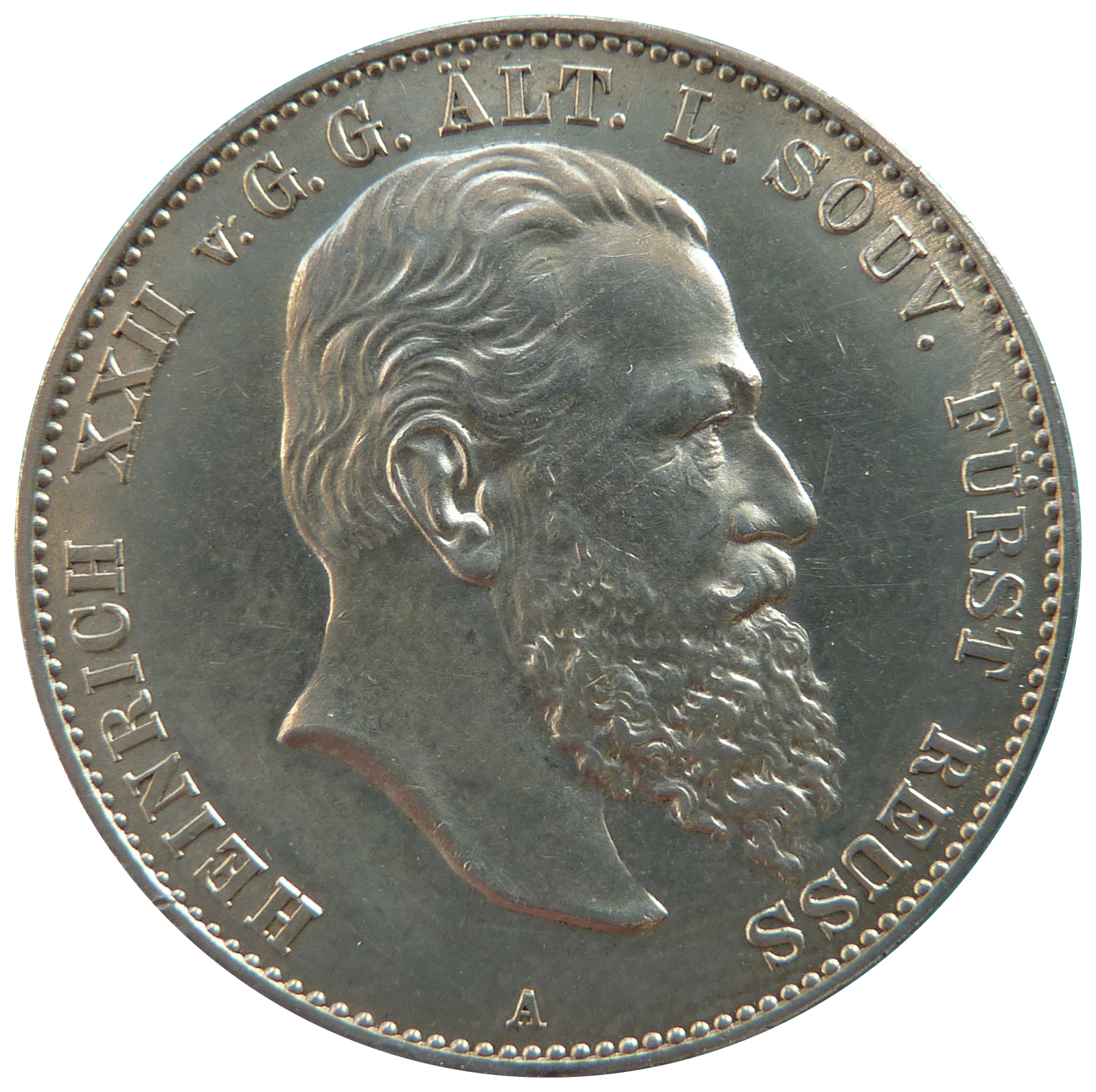
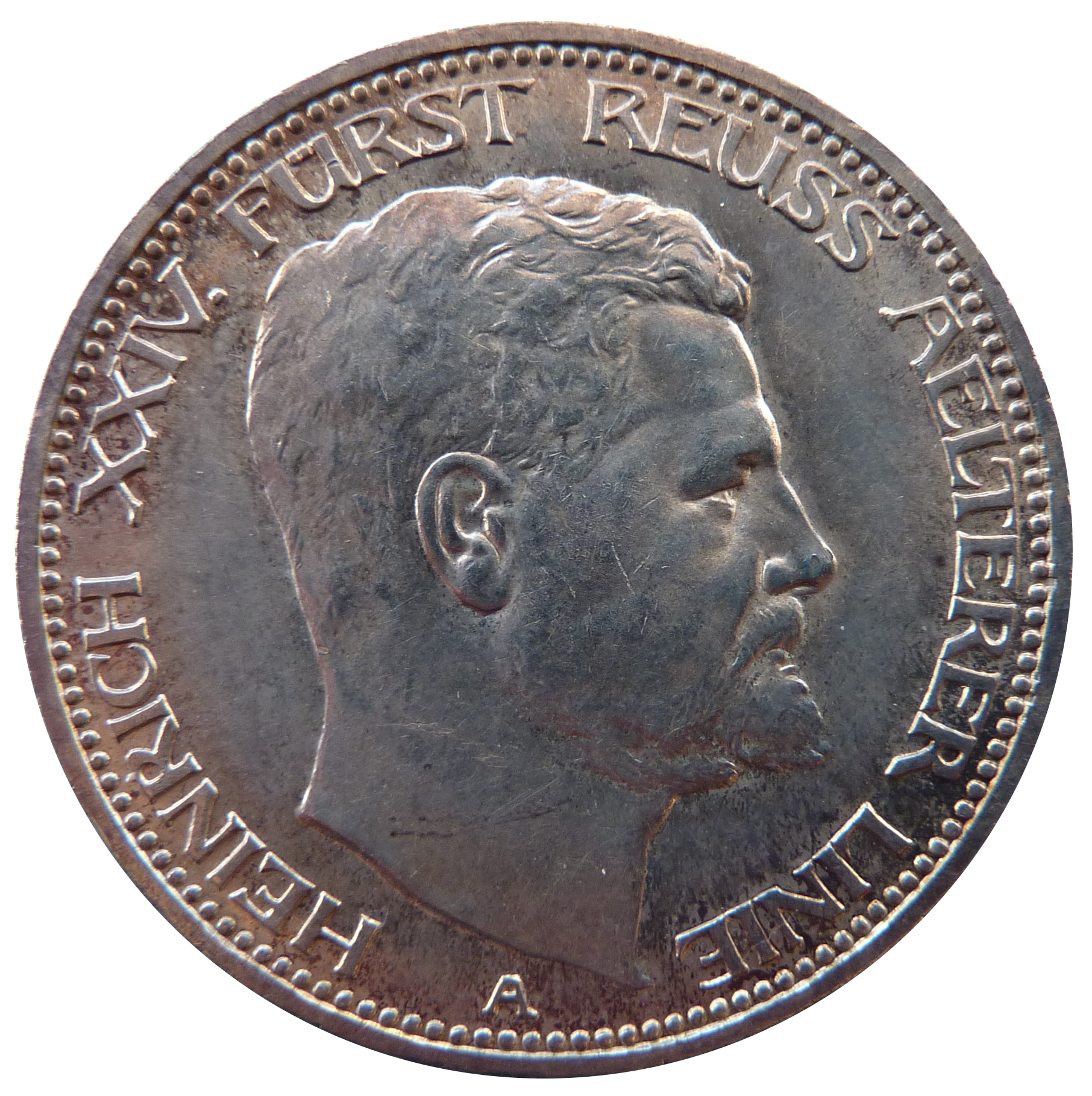
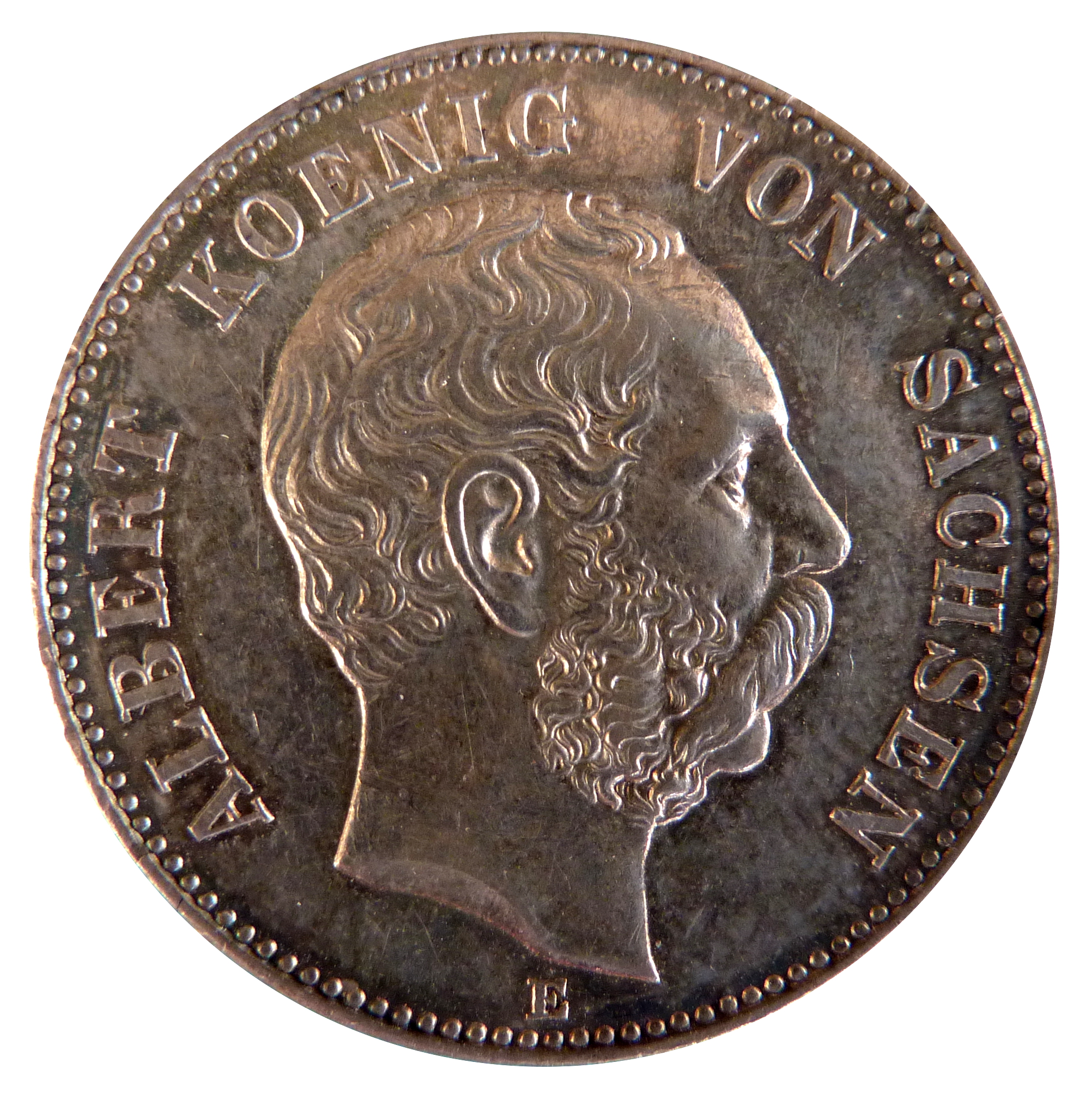
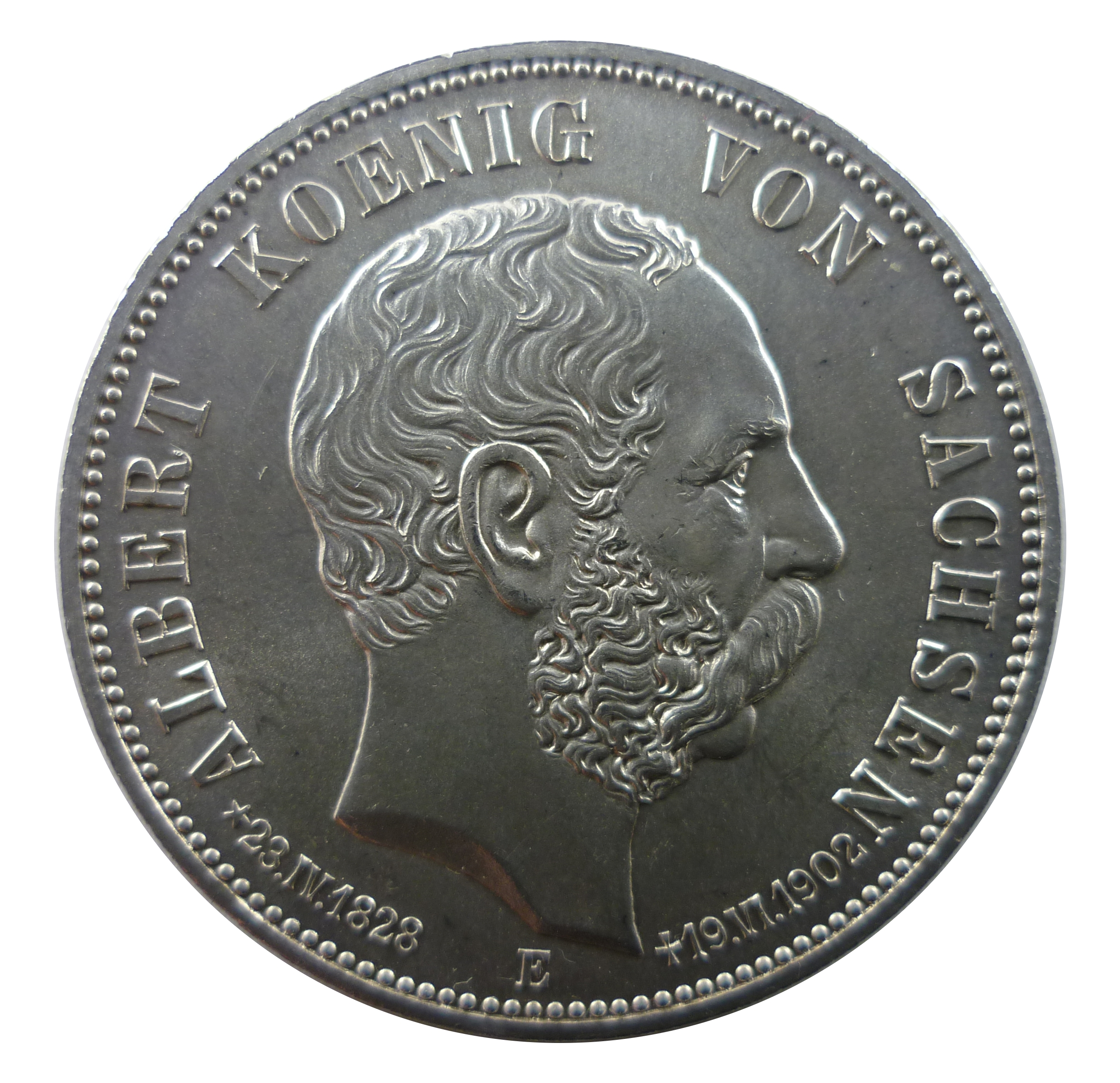
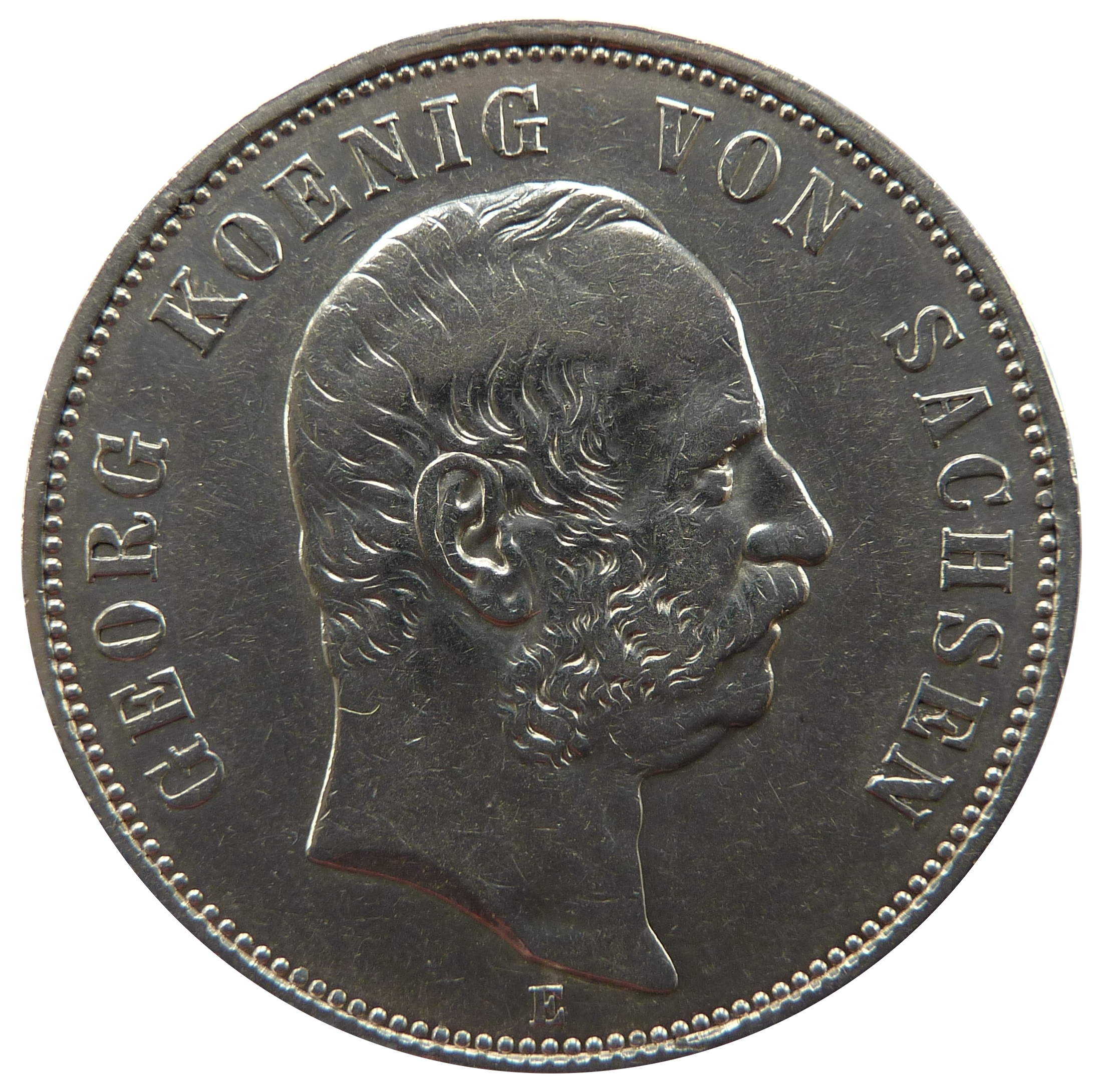
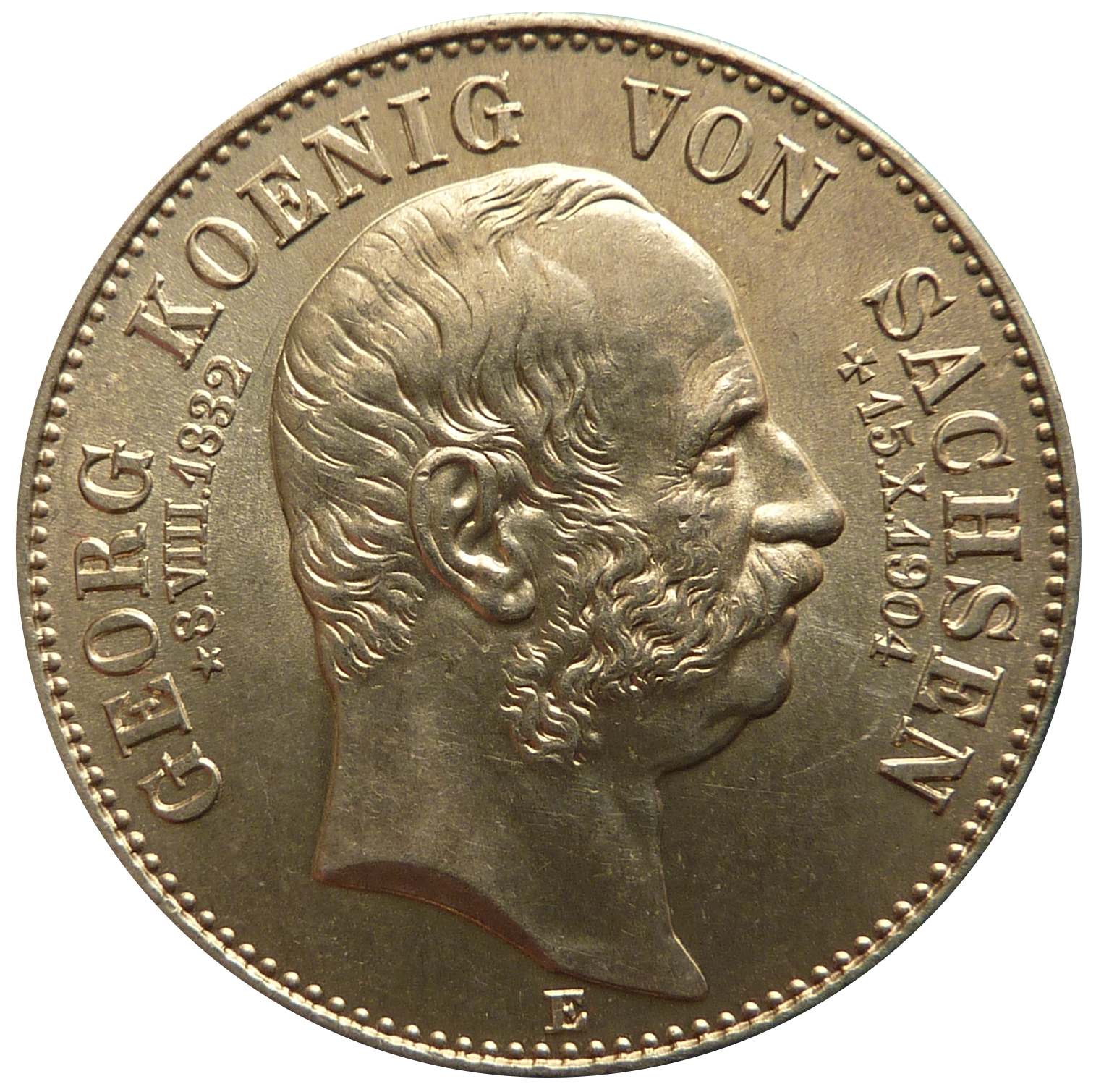
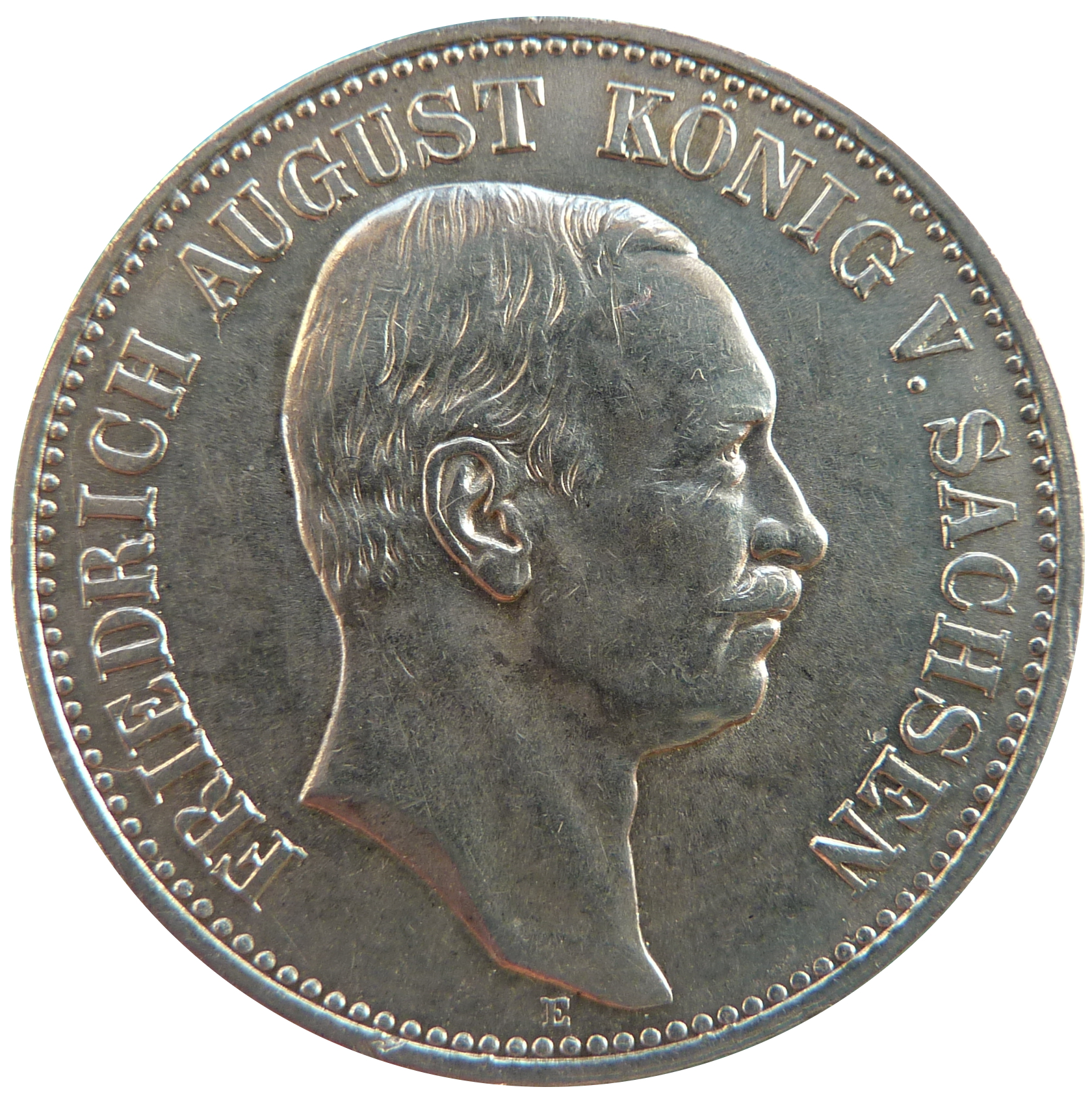
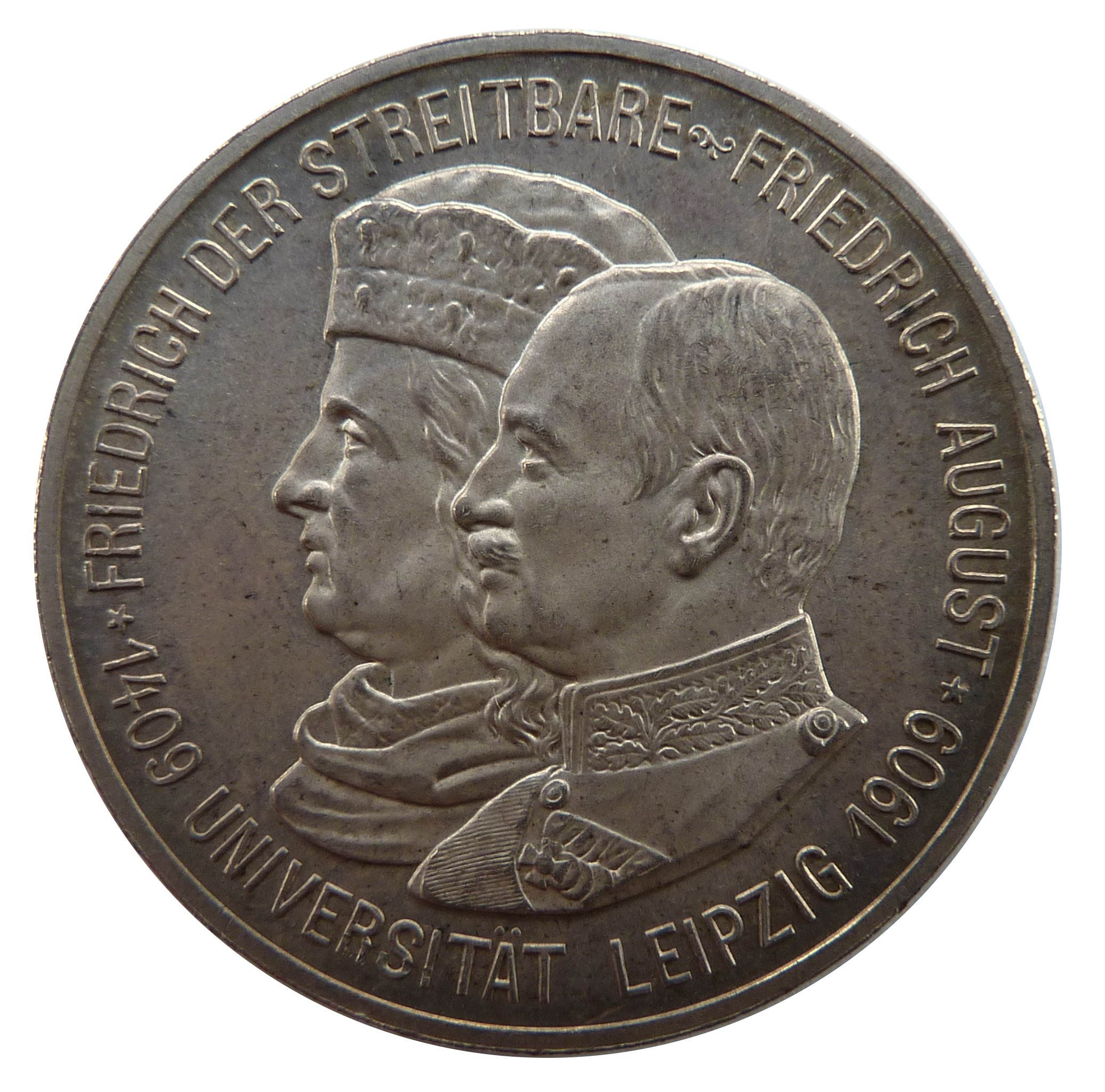
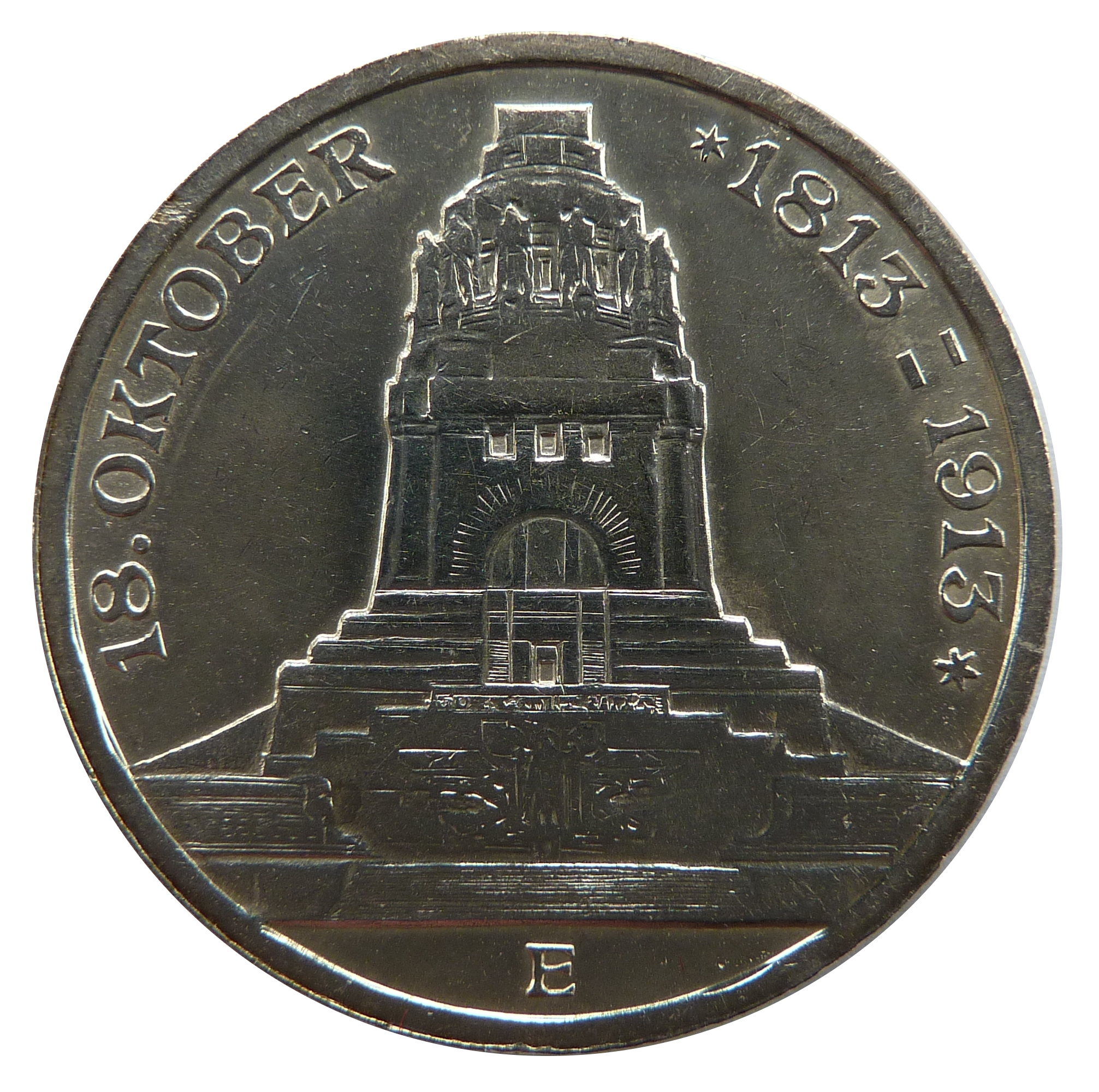
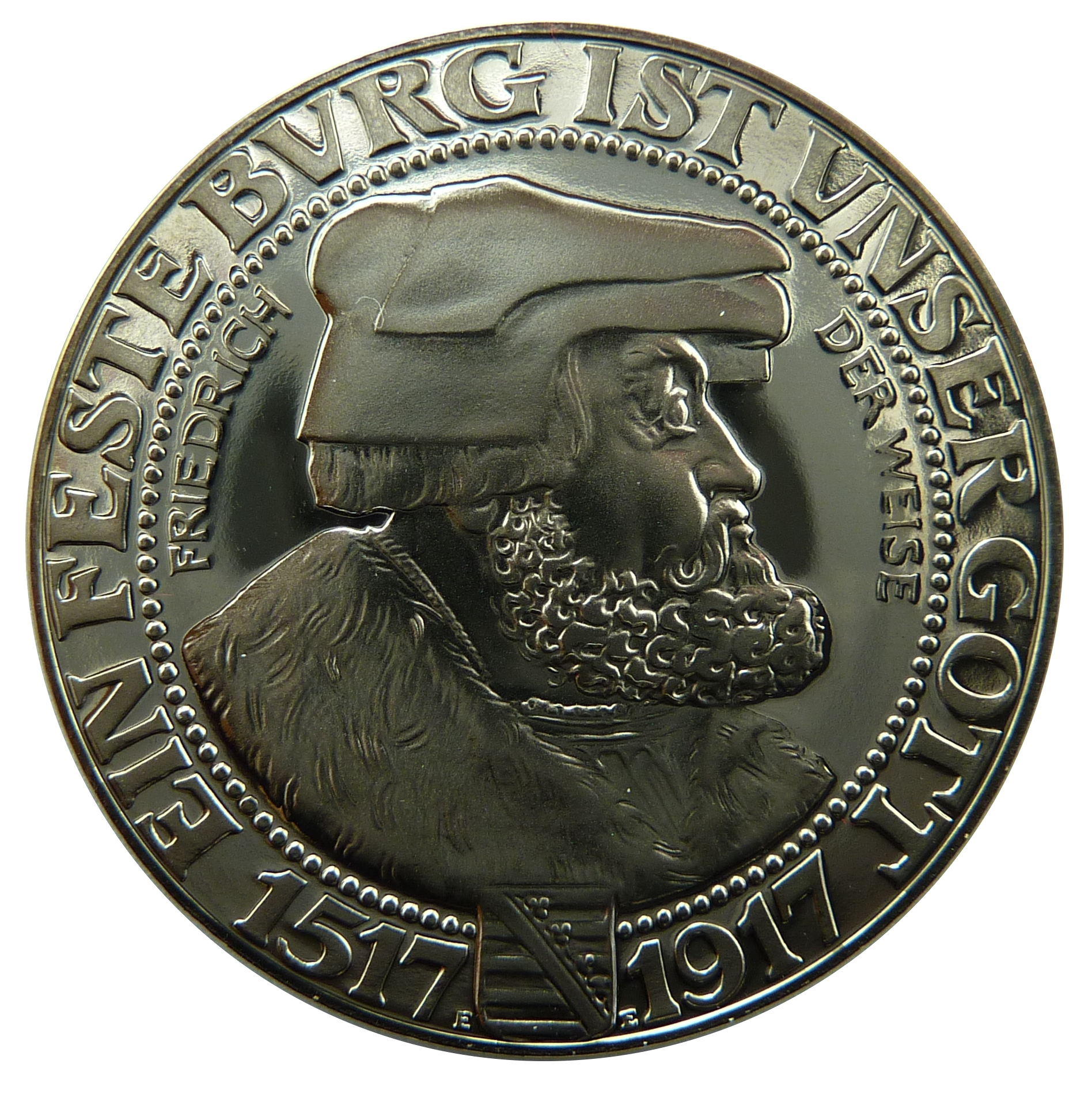
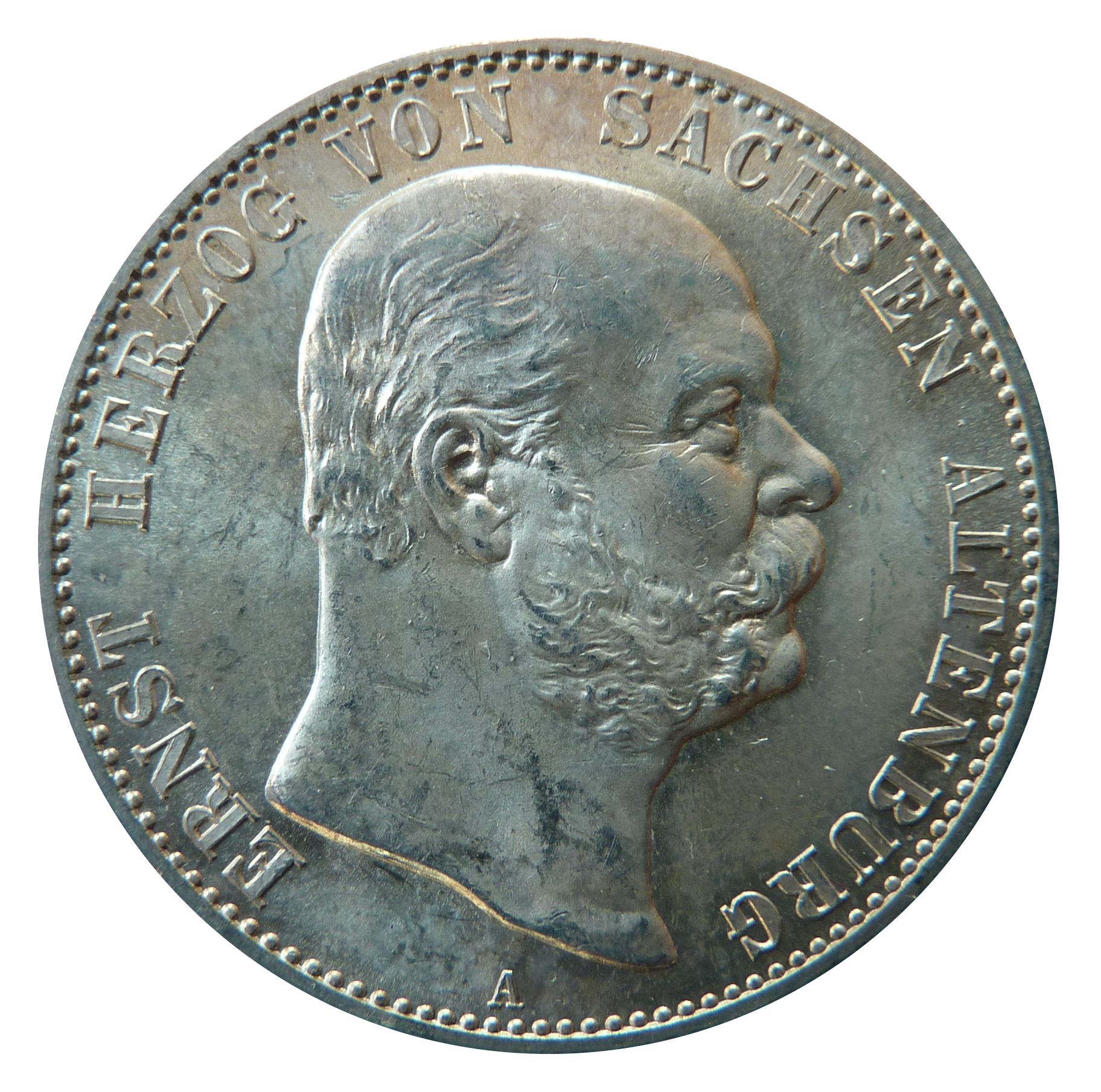
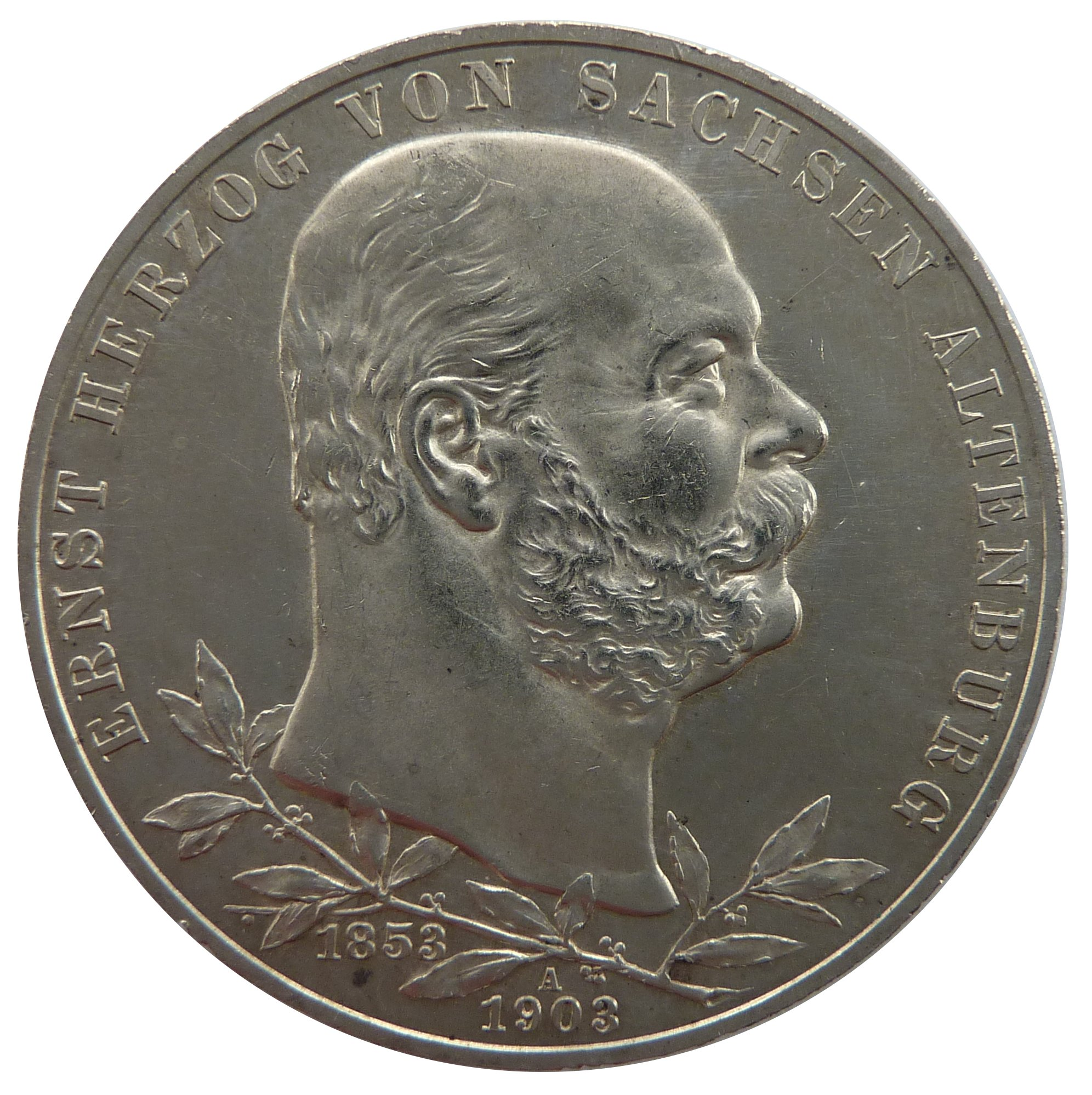
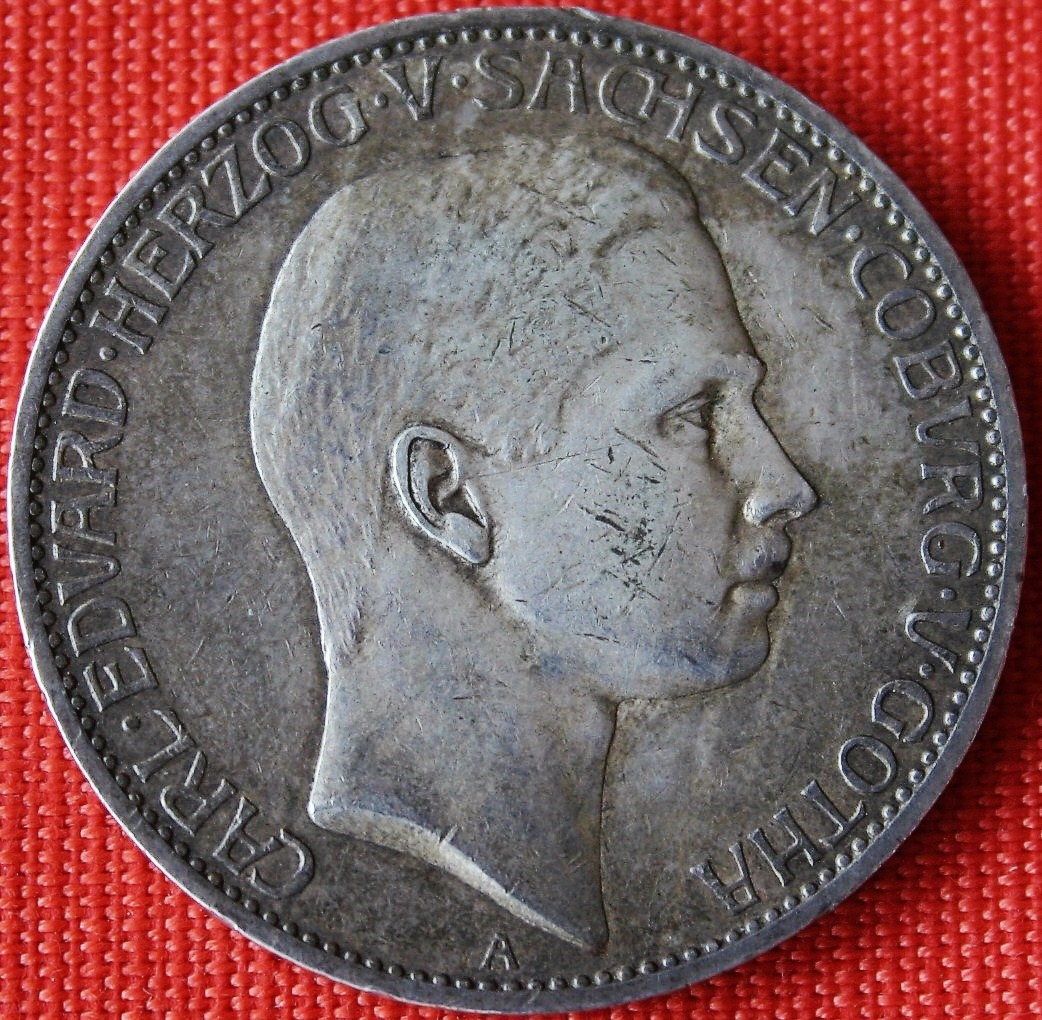
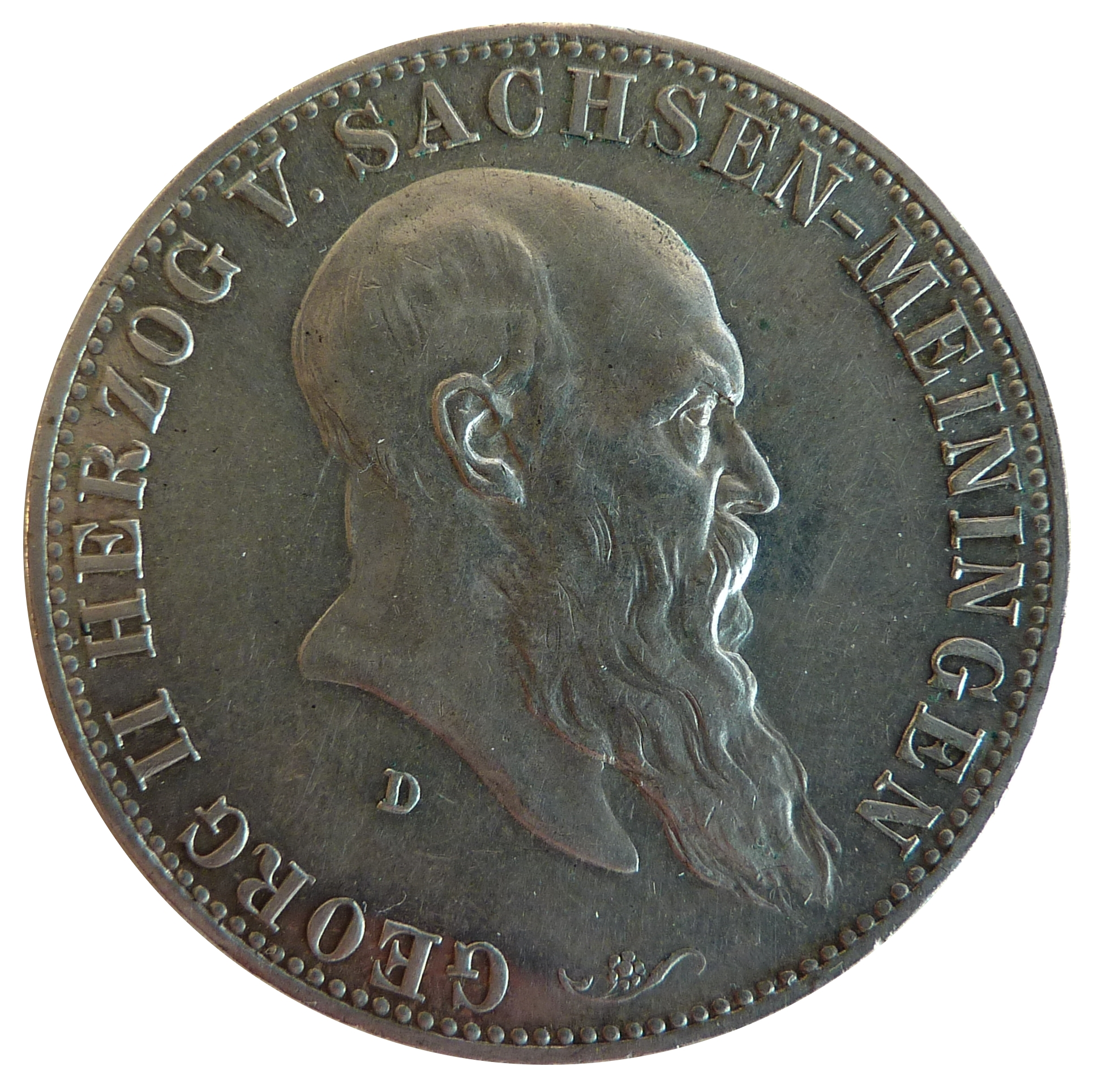
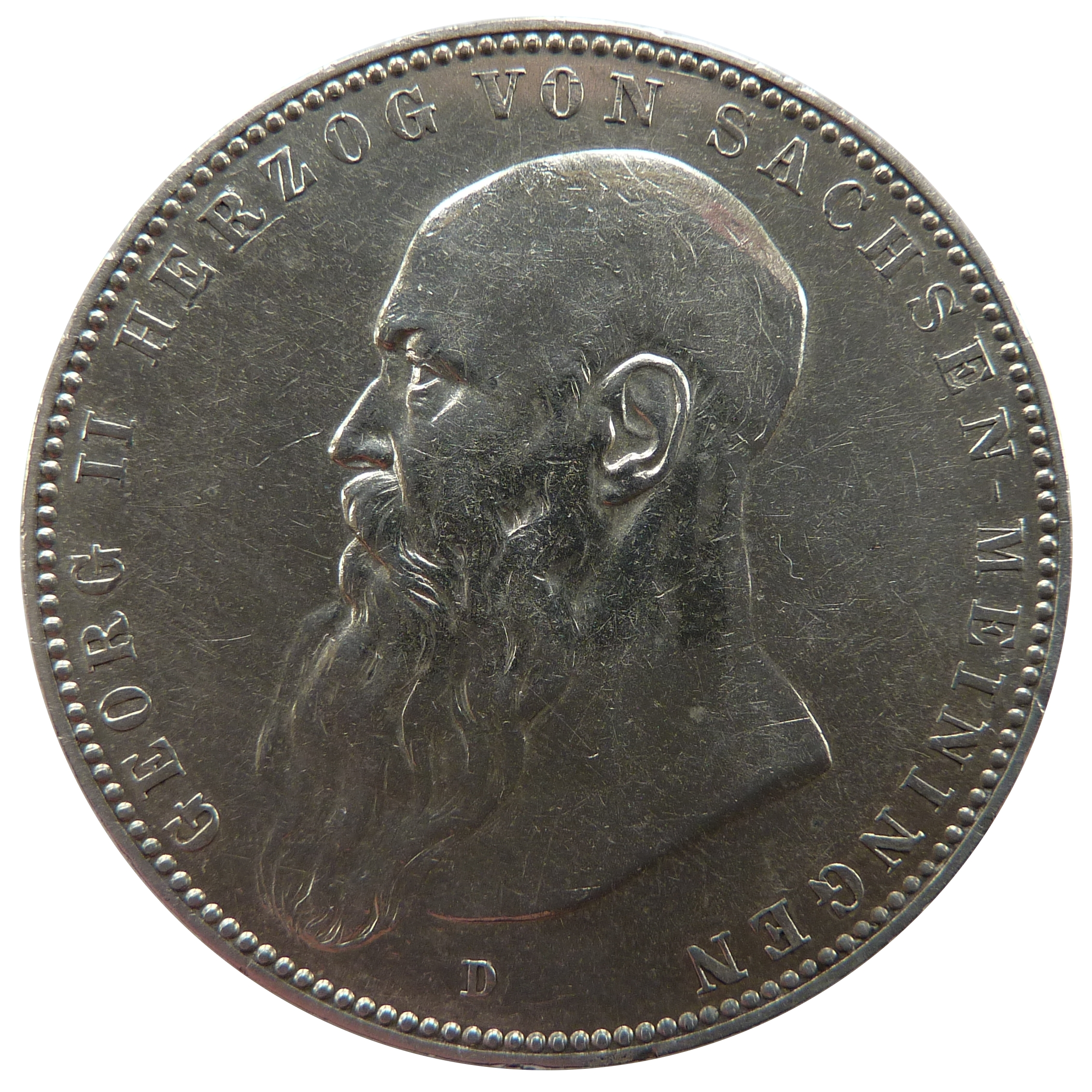
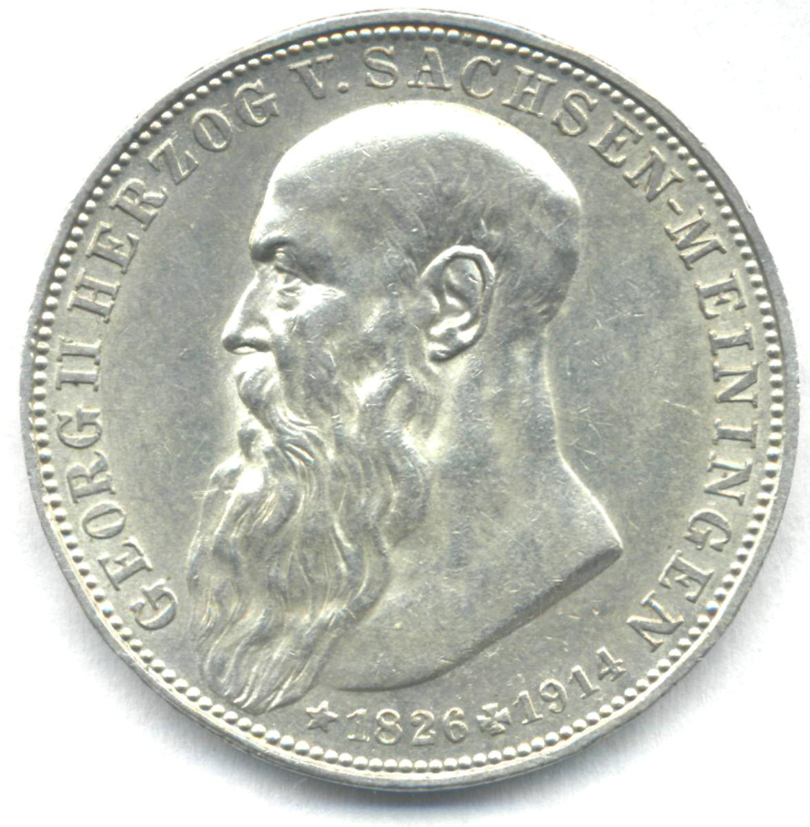
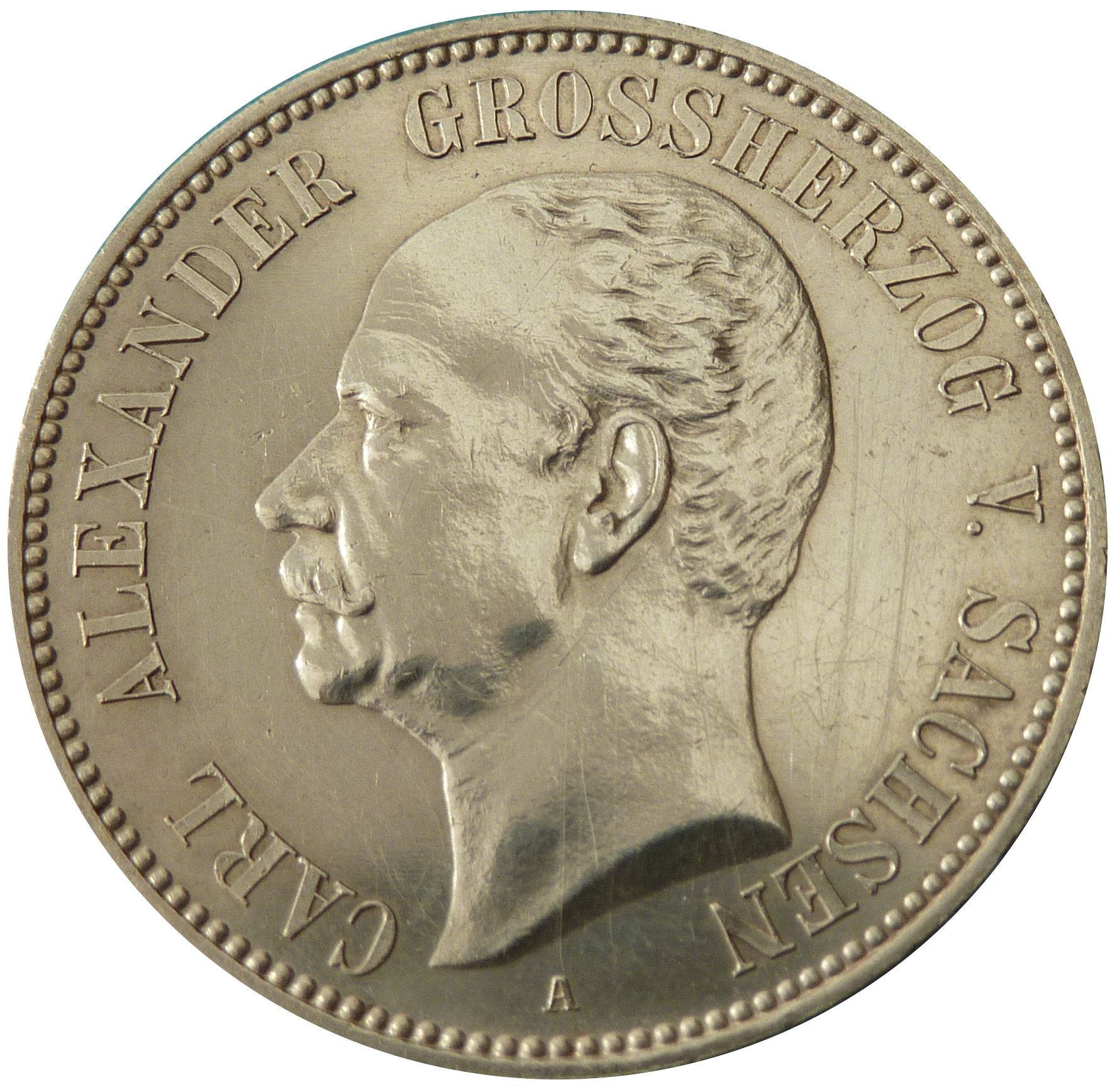
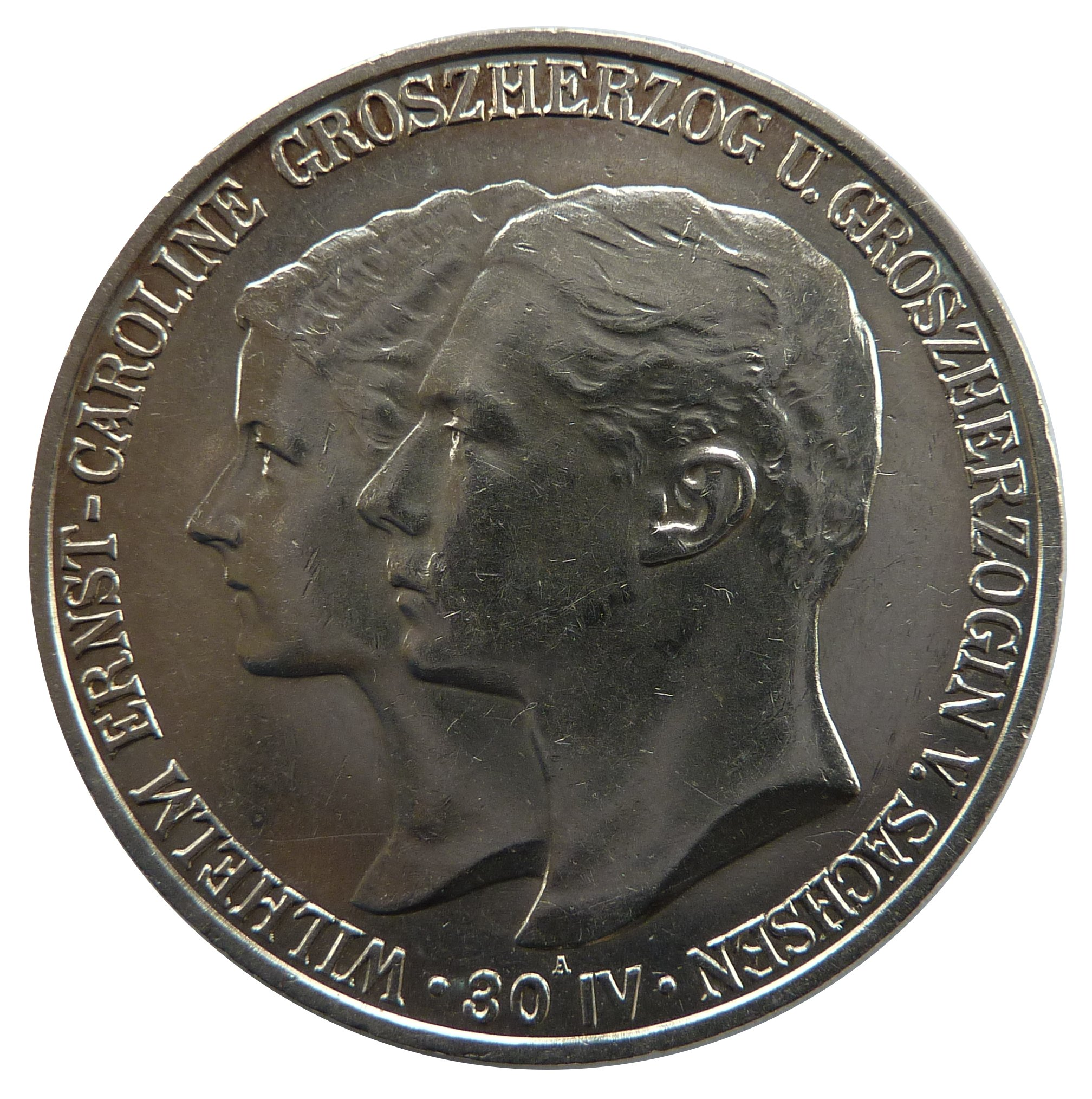
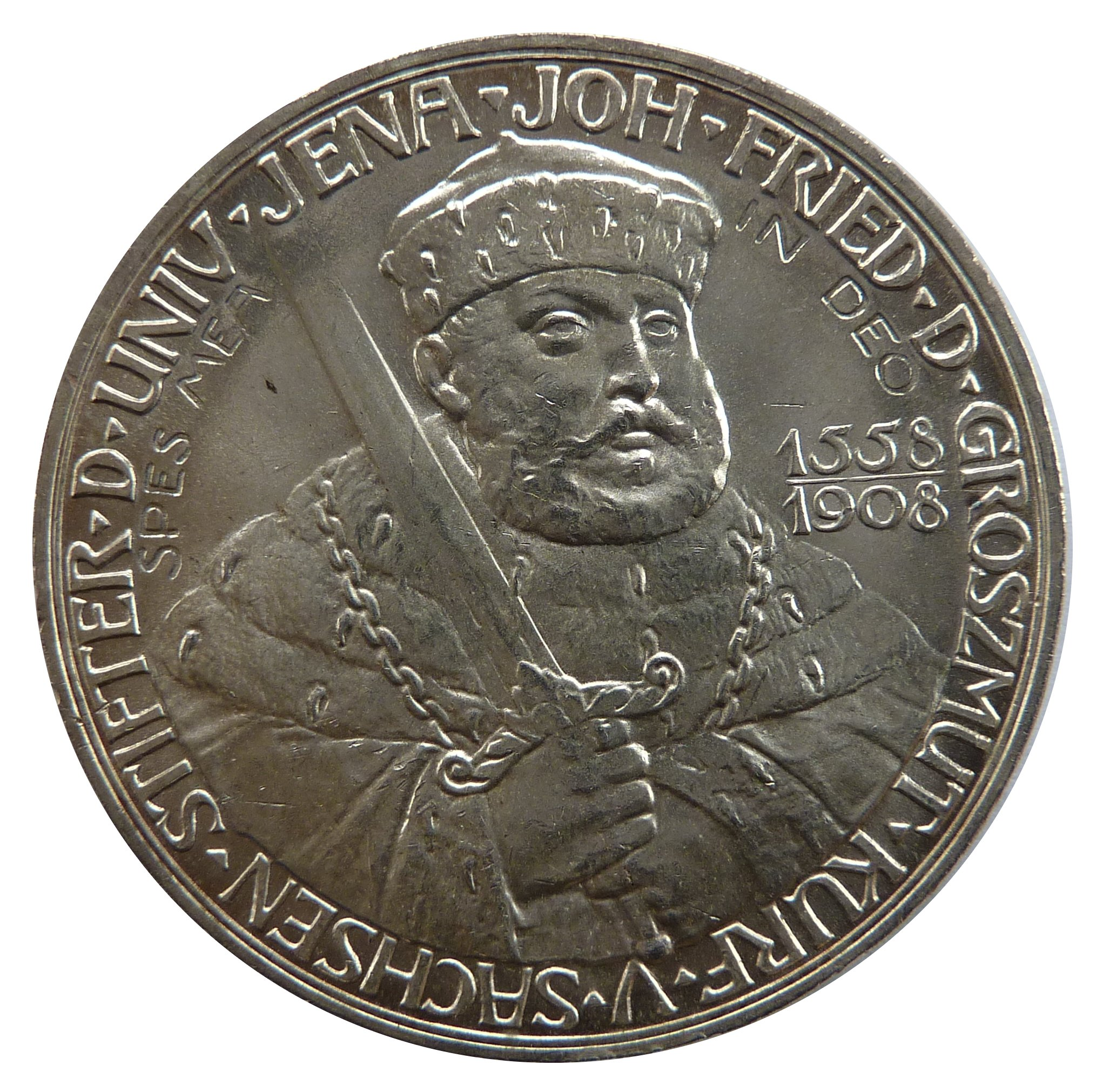
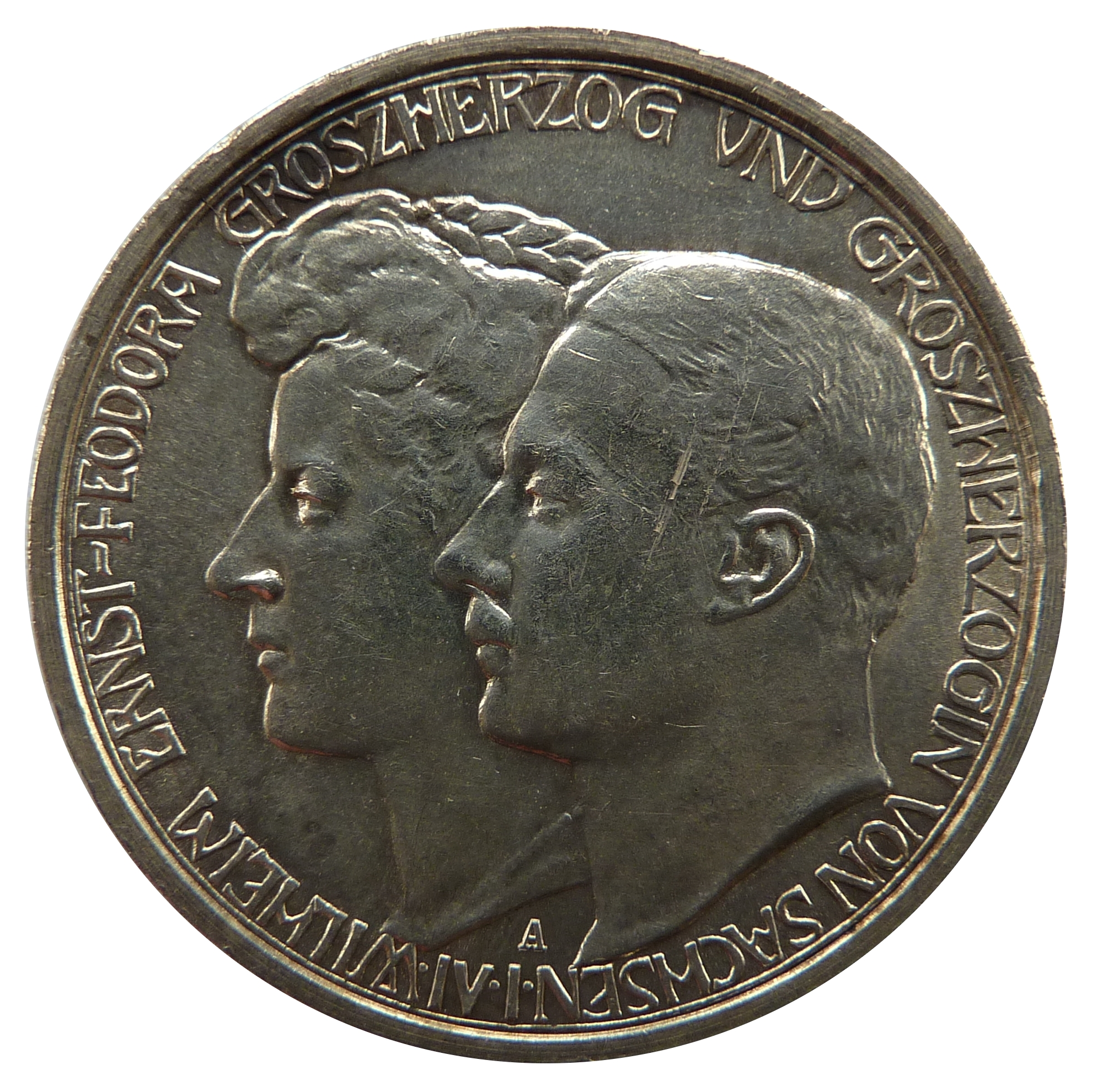
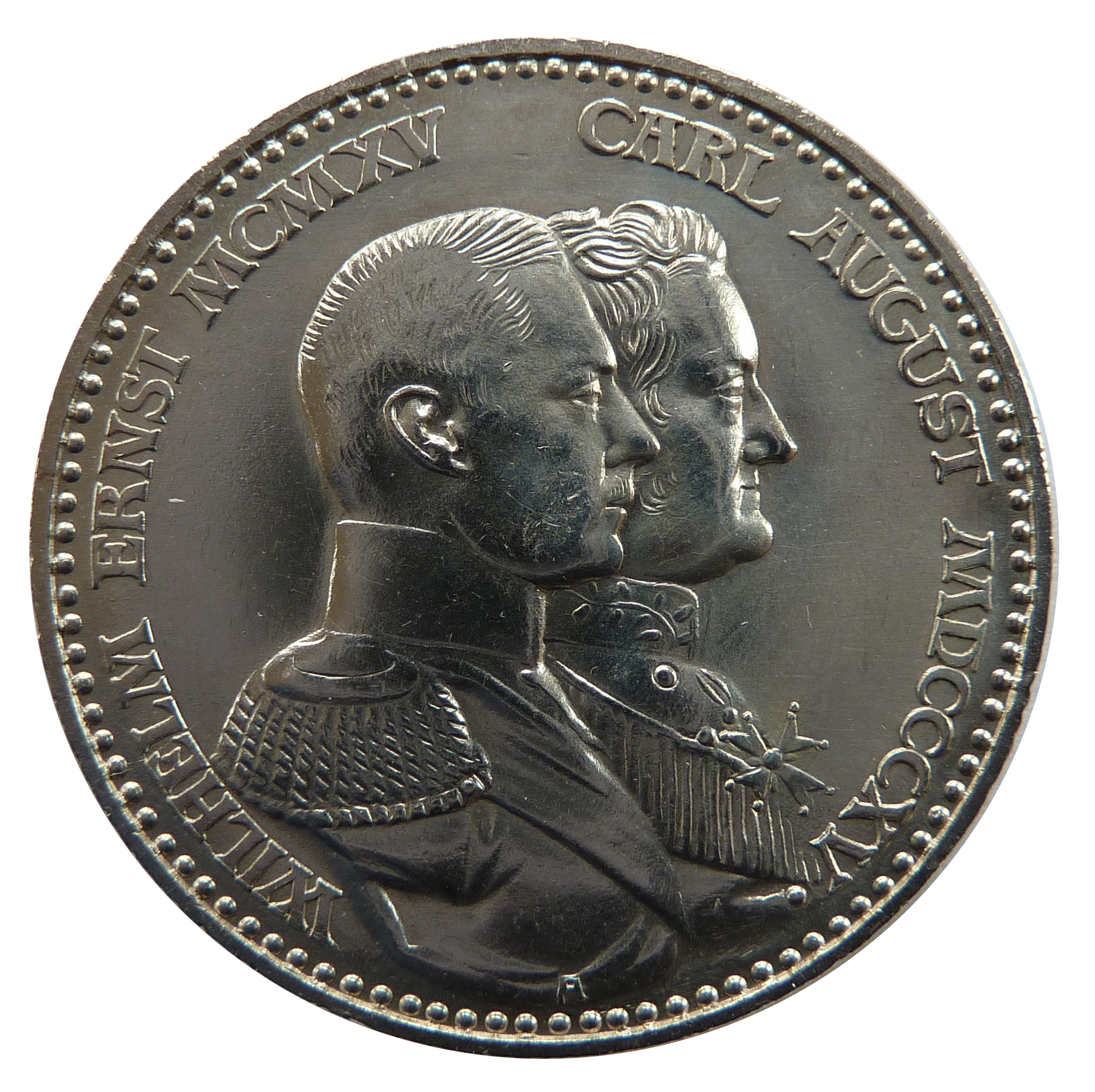
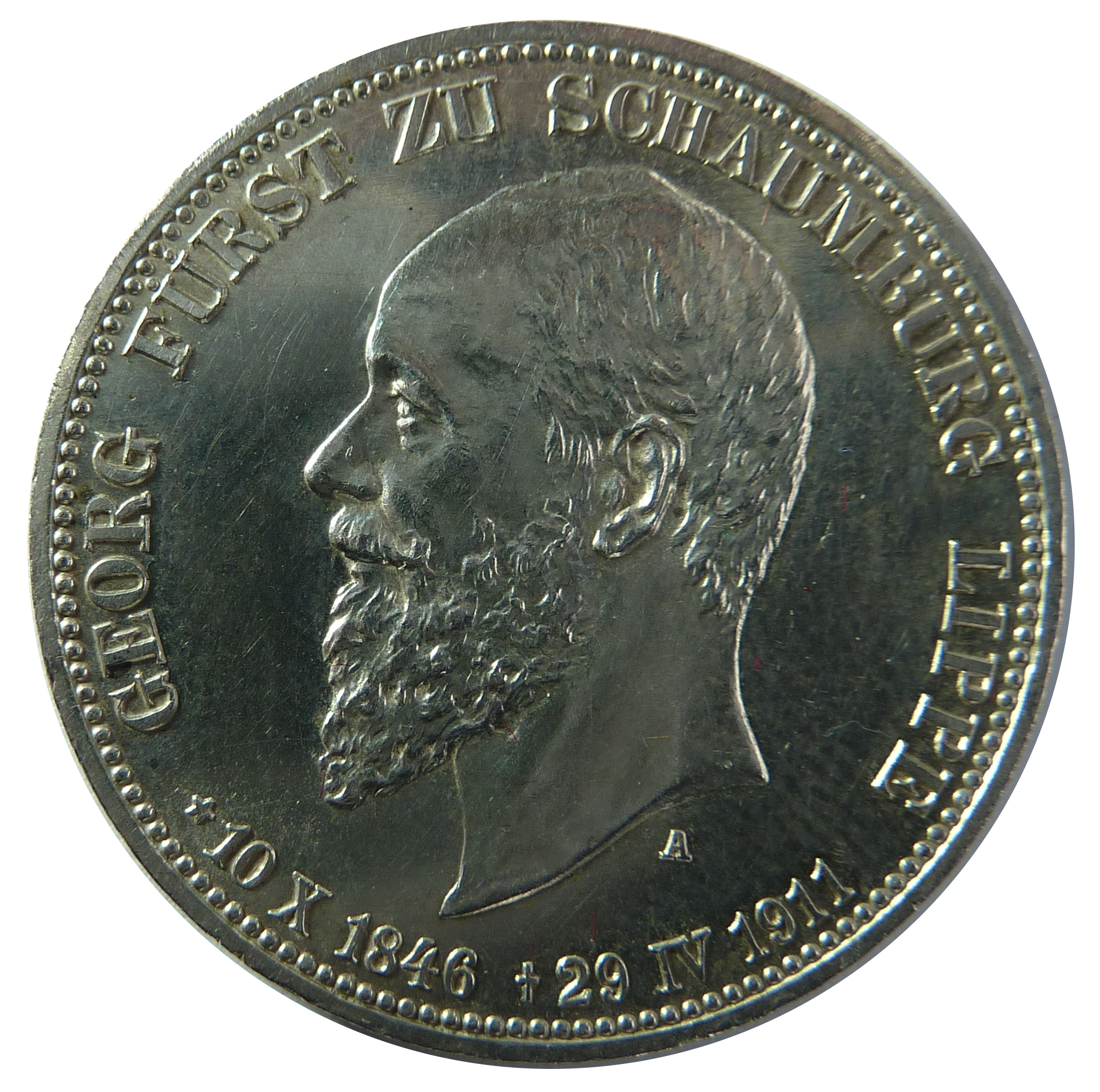
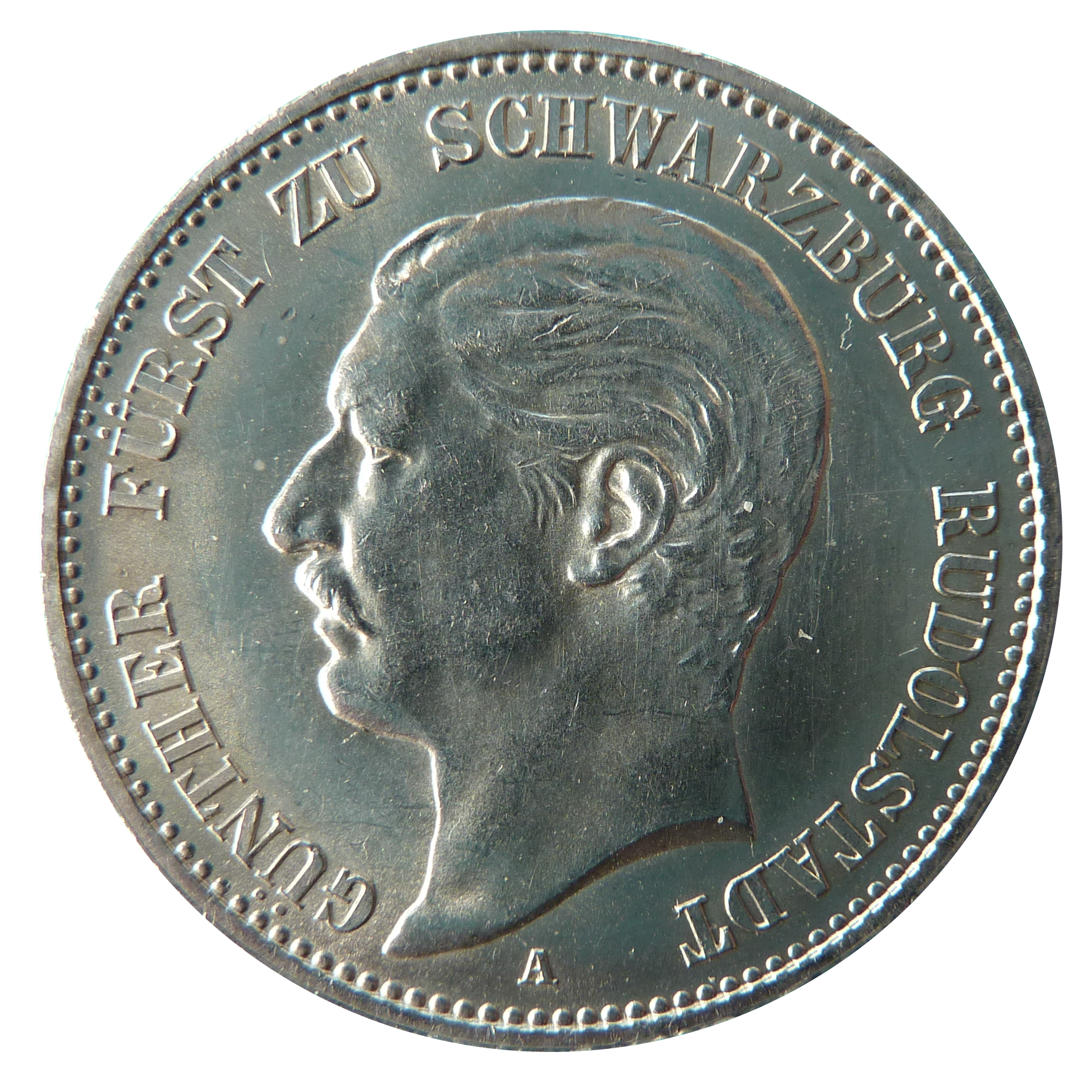
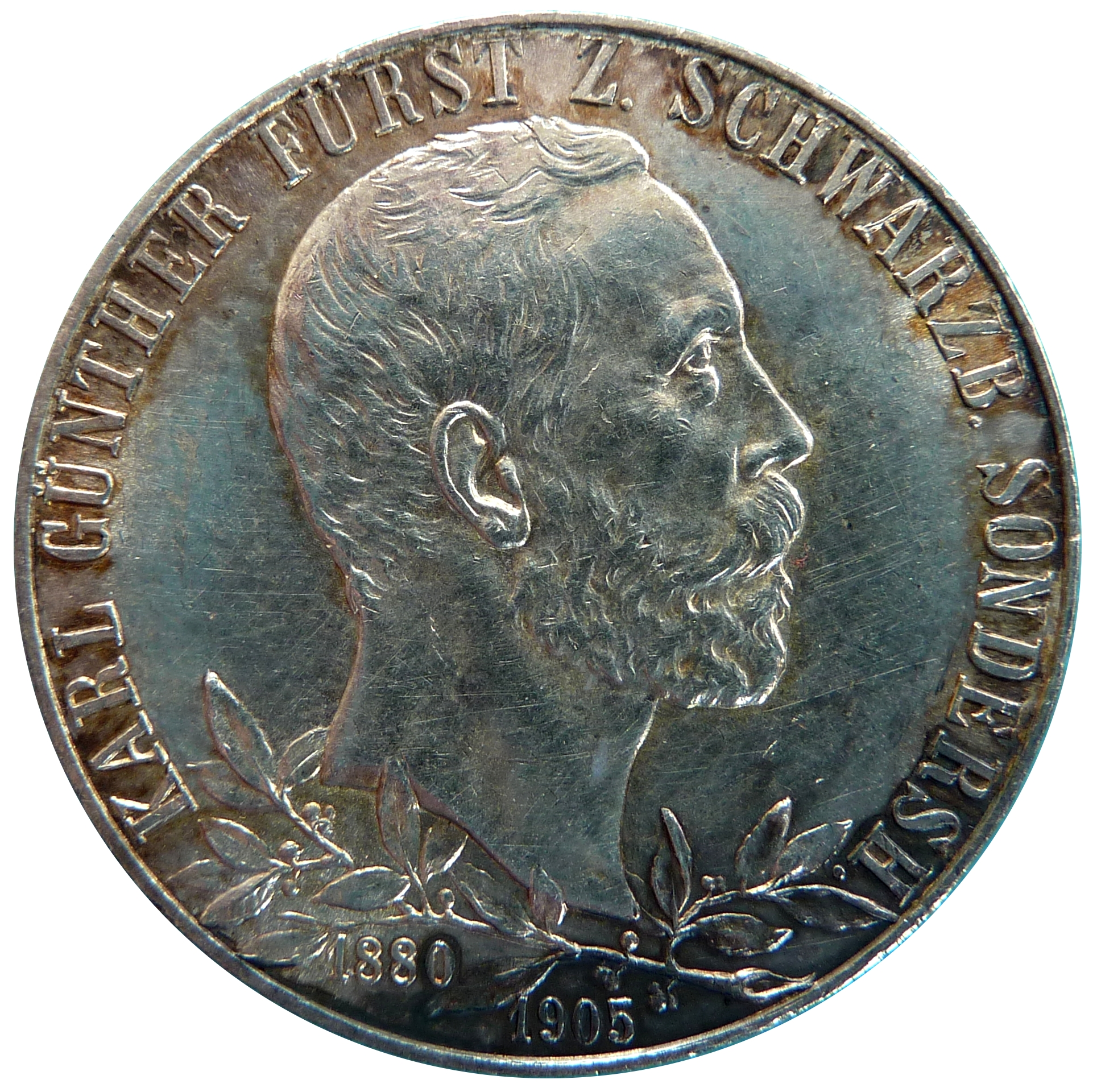
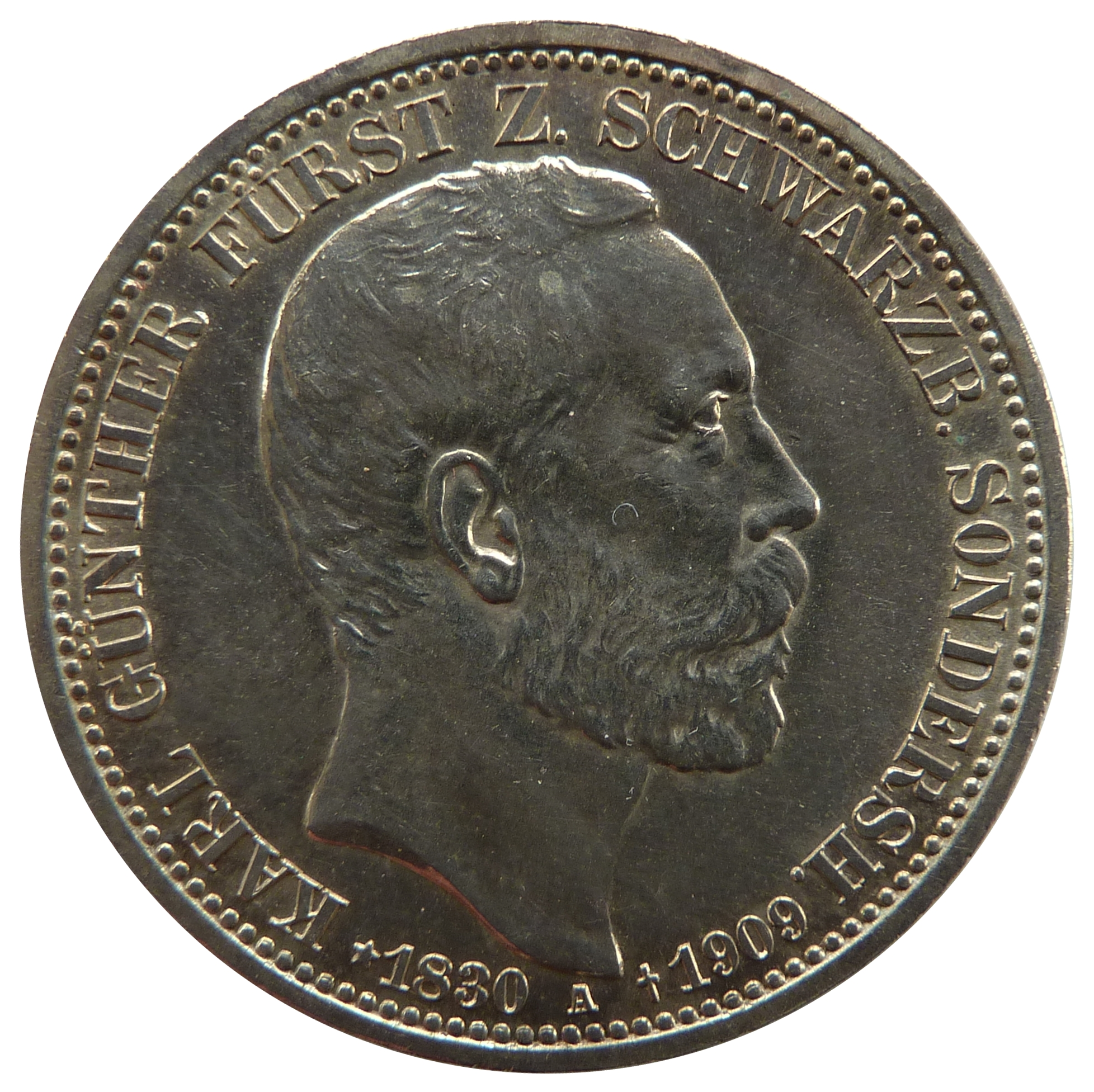
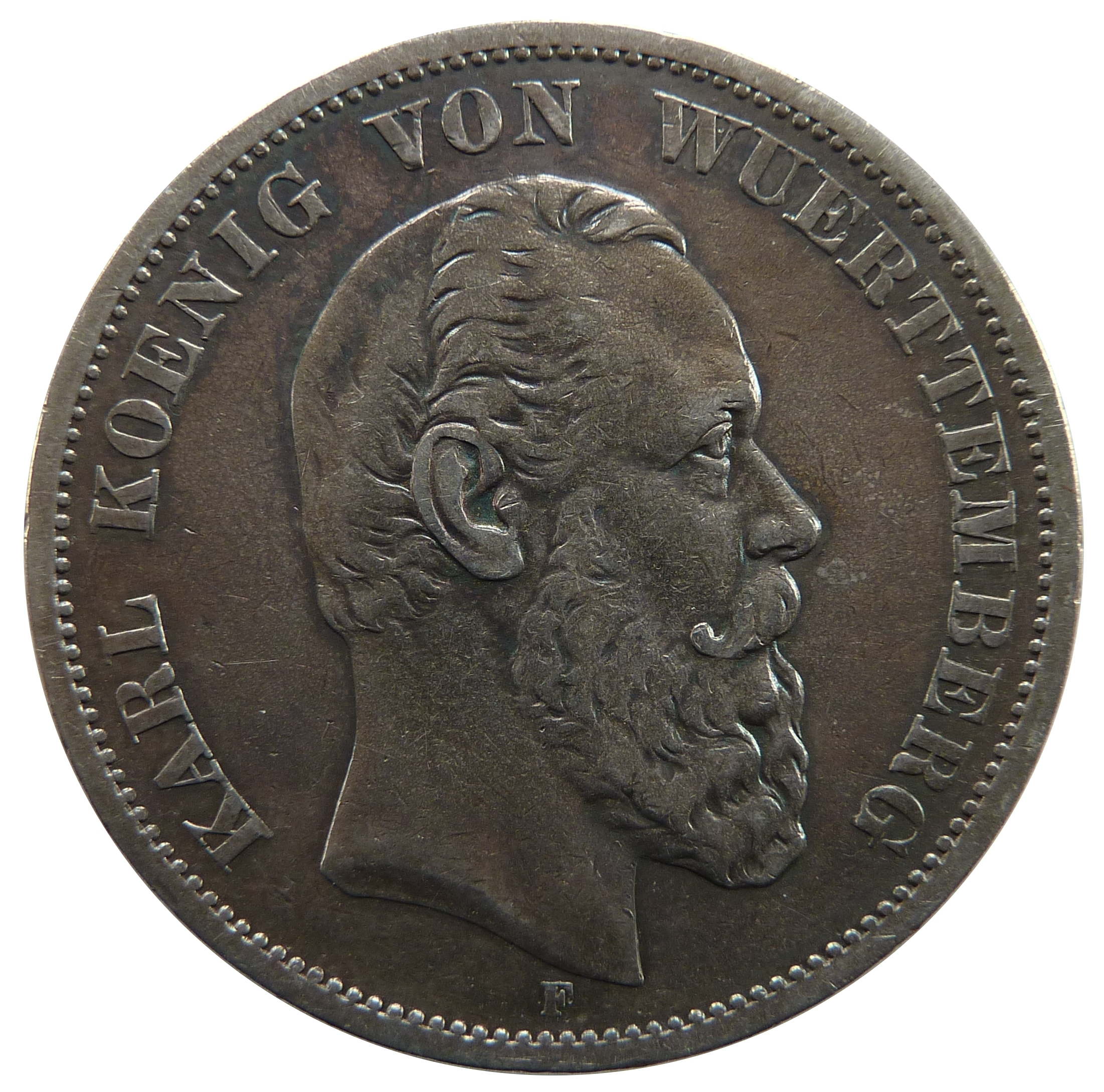
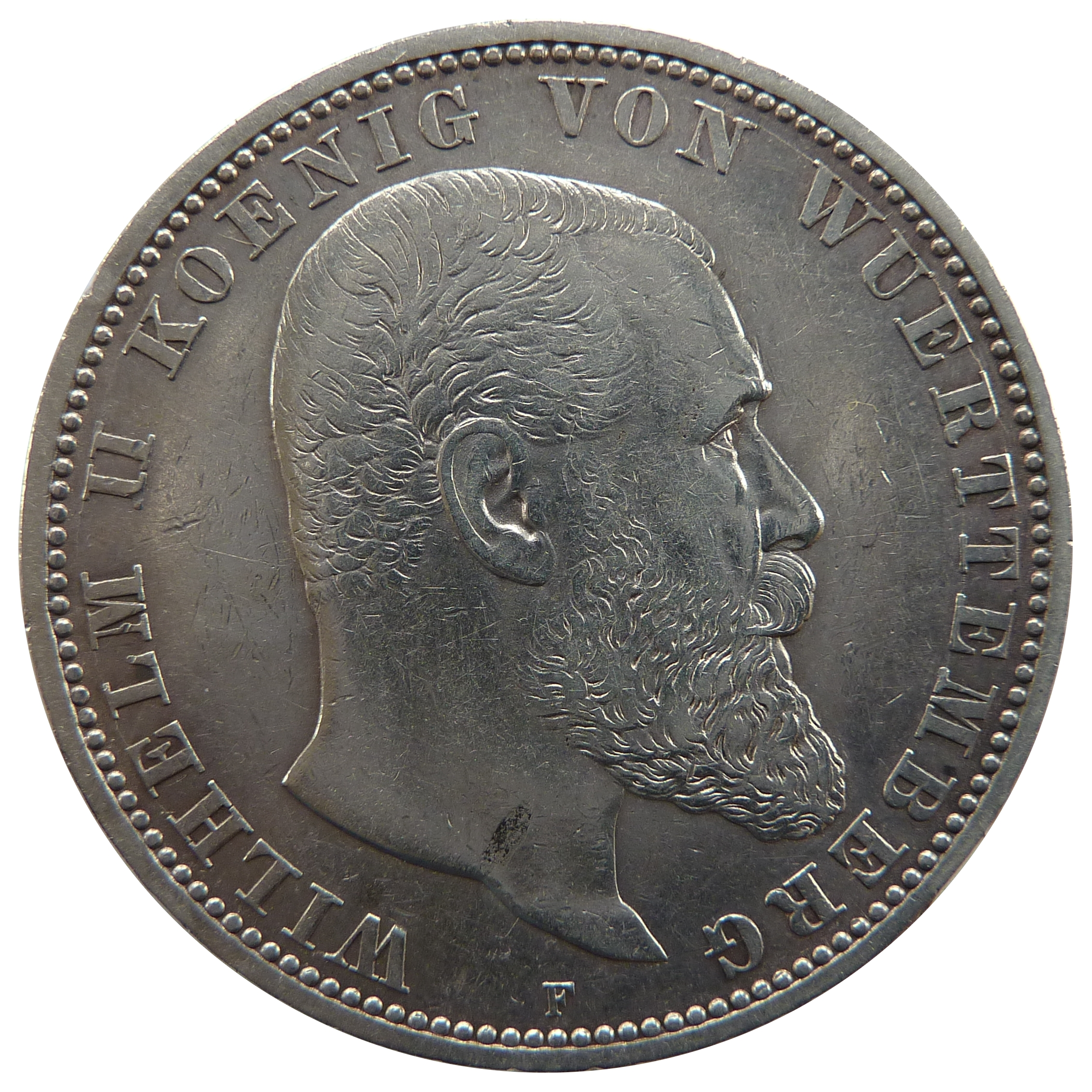
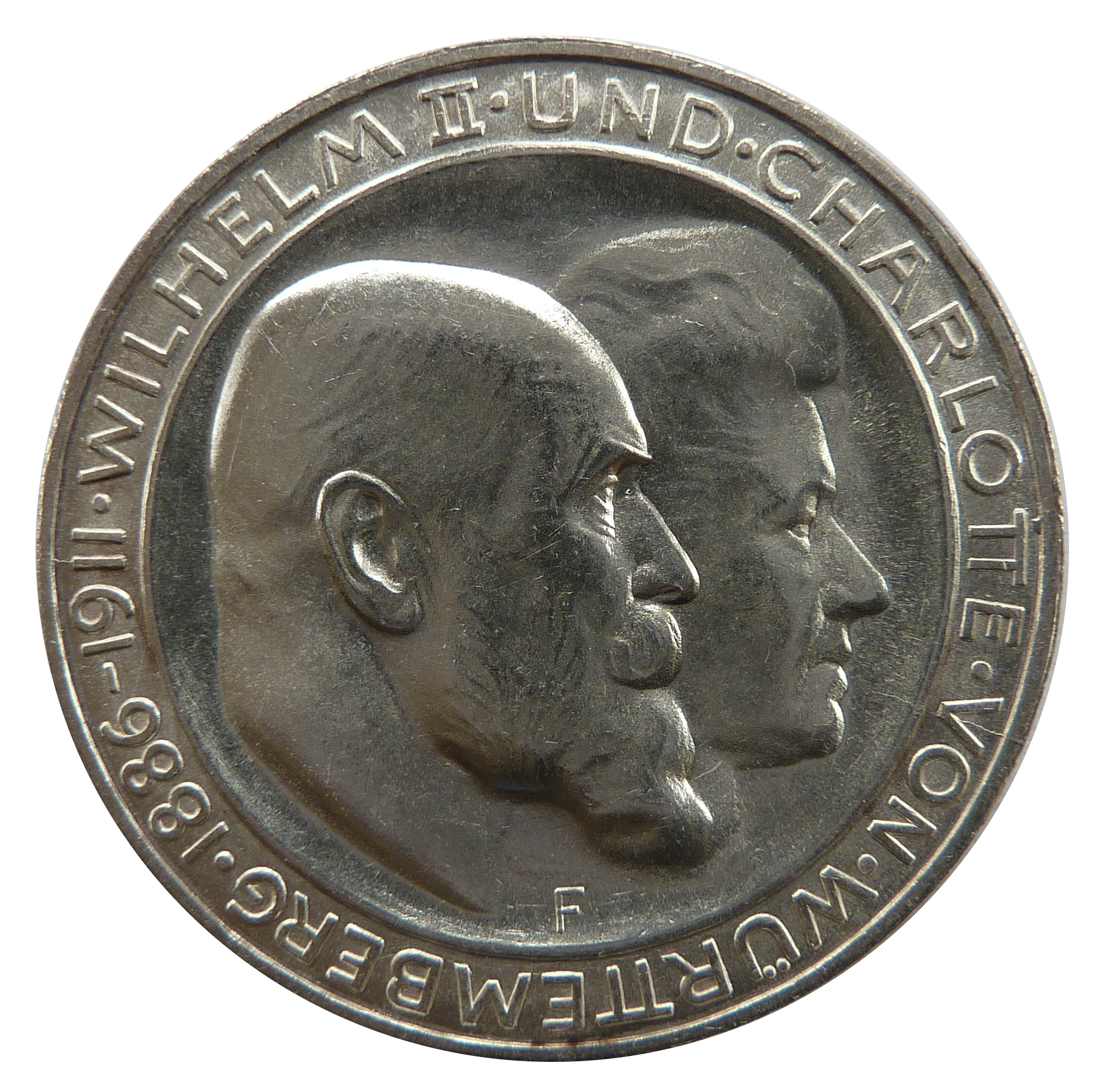
Duchy of Anhalt Capital: Dessau; area: 2,299 km^{2}
Image	Denominations	Year(s) of issue	Circulation/Commemorative coin Occasion/motif	Location of mint	Number minted
Image	Denominations	Year(s) of issue	Circulation/Commemorative coin Occasion/motif	Location of mint	MS	PF
	2 Mark	1876	Circulation coin Frederick I	A	200,000	–
	2 Mark	1896	Commemorative coin 25th anniversary of the reign of Frederick I	A	50,000	available
	5 Mark	1896	Commemorative coin 25th anniversary of the reign of Frederick I	A	10,000	available
	2 Mark	1904	Commemorative coin Inauguration of the reign of Frederick II	A	50,000	150
	3 Mark	1909; 1911	Circulation coin Frederick II	A	100,000; 100,000	100
	3 Mark	1914	Commemorative coin Silver wedding of Frederick II and Marie	A	200,000	1,000
	5 Mark	1914	Commemorative coin Silver wedding of Frederick II and Marie	A	30,000	1,000
Grand Duchy of Baden Capital: Karlsruhe; area: 15,069 km^{2}
Image	Denominations	Year(s) of issue	Circulation/Commemorative coin Occasion/motif	Location of mint	Number minted
Image	Denominations	Year(s) of issue	Circulation/Commemorative coin Occasion/motif	Location of mint	MS	PF
	2 Mark	1876; 1877; 1880; 1883; 1888	Circulation coin Frederick I	G	1,739,038; 763,927; 74,000; 45,493; 75,279	available
	5 Mark	1874–1876; 1888	Circulation coin Frederick I	G	786,994; 30,111	available
	2 Mark	1892; 1894; 1896; 1898–1902	Circulation coin Frederick I	G	106,750; 106,750; 213,520; 1,093,412	available
	5 Mark	1891; 1893–1895; 1898–1902	Circulation coin Frederick I	G	42,700; 177,033; 491,605	available
	2 Mark	1902	Commemorative coin 50th anniversary of the reign of Frederick I	G	375,018	–
	5 Mark	1902	Commemorative coin 50th anniversary of the reign of Frederick I	G	50,024	–
	2 Mark	1902–1907	Circulation coin Frederick I	G	3,444,401	available
	5 Mark	1902–1904; 1907	Circulation coin Frederick I	G	805,119; 243,821	available
	2 Mark	1906	Commemorative coin Golden wedding of Frederick I and Louise	G	350,000	–
	5 Mark	1906	Commemorative coin Golden wedding of Frederick I and Louise	G	60,000	–
	2 Mark	1907	Commemorative coin Death of Frederick I	G	350,002	available
	5 Mark	1907	Commemorative coin Death of Frederick I	G	60,000	available
	2 Mark	1911; 1913	Circulation coin Frederick II	G	77,000; 289,690	available
	3 Mark	1908–1915	Circulation coin Frederick II	G	3,464,251	available
	5 Mark	1908; 1913	Circulation coin Frederick II	G	281,568; 244,000	available
Kingdom of Bavaria Capital: Munich; area: 75,865 km^{2}
Image	Denominations	Year(s) of issue	Circulation/Commemorative coin Occasion/motif	Location of mint	Number minted
Image	Denominations	Year(s) of issue	Circulation/Commemorative coin Occasion/motif	Location of mint	MS	PF
	2 Mark	1876; 1877; 1880; 1883	Circulation coin Louis II	D	5,370,139; 1,511,500; 168,974; 104,217	available
	5 Mark	1874–1876	Circulation coin Louis II	D	1,871,266	available
	2 Mark	1888	Circulation coin Otto	D	172,368	–
	5 Mark	1888	Circulation coin Otto	D	68,947	–
	2 Mark	1891; 1893; 1896; 1898–1908; 1912–1913	Circulation coin Otto	D	246,050; 246,050; 492,131; 12,733,516; 311,350	available
	5 Mark	1891; 1893–1896; 1898–1908; 1913	Circulation coin Otto	D	98,420; 407,741; 4,420,268; 420,000	available
	3 Mark	1908–1913	Circulation coin Otto	D	6,592,442	available
	2 Mark	1911	Commemorative coin 90th birthday and 25th anniversary of the reign of Prince Regent Luitpold	D	640,000	available
	3 Mark	1911	Commemorative coin 90th birthday and 25th anniversary of the reign of Prince Regent Luitpold	D	639,721	available
	5 Mark	1911	Commemorative coin 90th birthday and 25th anniversary of the reign of Prince Regent Luitpold	D	160,000	available
	2 Mark	1914	Circulation coin Louis III	D	573,533	available
	3 Mark	1914	Circulation coin Louis III	D	717,460	available
	5 Mark	1914	Circulation coin Louis III	D	142,400	available
	3 Mark	1918	Commemorative coin Golden wedding of Louis III and Maria Theresa	D	130	5
Duchy of Brunswick Capital: Brunswick; area: 3,672 km^{2}
Image	Denominations	Year(s) of issue	Circulation/Commemorative coin Occasion/motif	Location of mint	Number minted
Image	Denominations	Year(s) of issue	Circulation/Commemorative coin Occasion/motif	Location of mint	MS	PF
	3 Mark	1915	Commemorative coin Inauguration of the reign of Ernest Augustus; Marriage to Victoria Louise (without Lüneburg in the title)	A	few	ca. 1,700
	5 Mark	1915	Commemorative coin Inauguration of the reign of Ernest Augustus; Marriage to Victoria Louise (without Lüneburg in the title)	A	few	ca. 1,400
	3 Mark	1915	Commemorative coin Inauguration of the reign of Ernest Augustus; Marriage to Victoria Louise	A	31,634	–
	5 Mark	1915	Commemorative coin Inauguration of the reign of Ernest Augustus; Marriage to Victoria Louise	A	8,600	available
Free Hanseatic City of Bremen Capital: Bremen; area: 256 km^{2}
Image	Denominations	Year(s) of issue	Circulation/Commemorative coin Occasion/motif	Location of mint	Number minted
Image	Denominations	Year(s) of issue	Circulation/Commemorative coin Occasion/motif	Location of mint	MS	PF
	2 Mark	1904	Circulation coin Coat of arms of the Free Hanseatic City of Bremen	J	100,000	200
	5 Mark	1906	Circulation coin Coat of arms of the Free Hanseatic City of Bremen	J	40,846	600
Free and Hanseatic City of Hamburg Capital: Hamburg; area: 415 km^{2}
Image	Denominations	Year(s) of issue	Circulation/Commemorative coin Occasion/motif	Location of mint	Number minted
Image	Denominations	Year(s) of issue	Circulation/Commemorative coin Occasion/motif	Location of mint	MS	PF
	2 Mark	1876–1878; 1880; 1883; 1888	Circulation coin Coat of arms of the Free and Hanseatic City of Hamburg	J	4,811,142; 98,936; 60,446; 99,820	available
	5 Mark	1875–1876; 1888	Circulation coin Coat of arms of the Free and Hanseatic City of Hamburg	J	1,215,661; 40,363	available
	2 Mark	1892–1893; 1896; 1898–1908; 1911–1914	Circulation coin Coat of arms of the Free and Hanseatic City of Hamburg	J	286,775; 286,434; 7,329,908; 715,833	available
	3 Mark	1908–1914	Circulation coin Coat of arms of the Free and Hanseatic City of Hamburg	J	4,654,966	available
	5 Mark	1891; 1893–1896; 1898–1908; 1913	Circulation coin Coat of arms of the Free and Hanseatic City of Hamburg	J	59,409; 234,400; 2,585,475; 326,800	available
Grand Duchy of Hesse Capital: Darmstadt; area: 7,688 km^{2}
Image	Denominations	Year(s) of issue	Circulation/Commemorative coin Occasion/motif	Location of mint	Number minted
Image	Denominations	Year(s) of issue	Circulation/Commemorative coin Occasion/motif	Location of mint	MS	PF
	2 Mark	1876–1877	Circulation coin Louis III	H	540,108	available
	5 Mark	1875–1876	Circulation coin Louis III	H	438,485	available
	2 Mark	1888	Circulation coin Louis IV	A	22,350	500
	5 Mark	1888	Circulation coin Louis IV	A	8,940	400
	2 Mark	1891	Circulation coin Louis IV	A	62,650	available
	5 Mark	1891	Circulation coin Louis IV	A	25,060	available
	2 Mark	1895–1896; 1898–1900	Circulation coin Ernest Louis	A	62,650; 96,600	200; 688
	5 Mark	1895; 1898–1900	Circulation coin Ernest Louis	A	39,380; 73,280	200; 566
	2 Mark	1904	Commemorative coin 400th birthday of Philip the Magnanimous	A	100,000	2,250
	5 Mark	1904	Commemorative coin 400th birthday of Philip the Magnanimous	A	40,000	700
	3 Mark	1910	Circulation coin Ernest Louis	A	200,000	500
	3 Mark	1917	Commemorative coin 25th anniversary of the reign of Ernest Louis	A	few	ca. 1,330
Principality of Lippe Capital: Detmold; area: 1,215 km^{2}
Image	Denominations	Year(s) of issue	Circulation/Commemorative coin Occasion/motif	Location of mint	Number minted
Image	Denominations	Year(s) of issue	Circulation/Commemorative coin Occasion/motif	Location of mint	MS	PF
	2 Mark	1906	Circulation coin Leopold IV	A	20,000	1,100
	3 Mark	1913	Circulation coin Leopold IV	A	15,000	100
Free City of Lübeck Capital: Lübeck; area: 298 km^{2} Before joining the imperial coinage system in 1873, Lübeck had used the Courantmark, a local reckoning currency shared with Hamburg.
Image	Denominations	Year(s) of issue	Circulation/Commemorative coin Occasion/motif	Location of mint	Number minted
Image	Denominations	Year(s) of issue	Circulation/Commemorative coin Occasion/motif	Location of mint	MS	PF
	2 Mark	1901	Circulation coin Coat of arms of the Free and Hanseatic City of Lübeck	A	25,000	250
	2 Mark	1904–1907; 1911–1912	Circulation coin Coat of arms of the Free and Hanseatic City of Lübeck	A	100,000; 50,000	578
	3 Mark	1908–1914	Circulation coin Coat of arms of the Free and Hanseatic City of Lübeck	A	174,002	available
	5 Mark	1904; 1907–1908; 1913	Circulation coin Coat of arms of the Free and Hanseatic City of Lübeck	A	10,000; 20,000; 6,000	200 available
Grand Duchy of Mecklenburg-Schwerin Capital: Schwerin; area: 13,127 km^{2}
Image	Denominations	Year(s) of issue	Circulation/Commemorative coin Occasion/motif	Location of mint	Number minted
Image	Denominations	Year(s) of issue	Circulation/Commemorative coin Occasion/motif	Location of mint	MS	PF
	2 Mark	1876	Circulation coin Frederick Francis II	A	300,000	–
	2 Mark	1901	Commemorative coin Inauguration of the reign of Frederick Francis IV on coming of age	A	50,000	1,000
	2 Mark	1904	Commemorative coin Wedding of Frederick Francis IV and Alexandra	A	100,000	6,000
	5 Mark	1904	Commemorative coin Wedding of Frederick Francis IV and Alexandra	A	40,000	2,500
	3 Mark	1915	Commemorative coin Centenary of the Grand Duchy	A	33,334	available
	5 Mark	1915	Commemorative coin Centenary of the Grand Duchy	A	10,000	available
Grand Duchy of Mecklenburg-Strelitz Capital: Neustrelitz; area: 2,929 km^{2}
Image	Denominations	Year(s) of issue	Circulation/Commemorative coin Occasion/motif	Location of mint	Number minted
Image	Denominations	Year(s) of issue	Circulation/Commemorative coin Occasion/motif	Location of mint	MS	PF
	2 Mark	1877	Circulation coin Frederick William	A	100,000	available
	2 Mark	1905	Circulation coin Adolphus Frederick V	A	10,000	2,500
	3 Mark	1913	Circulation coin Adolphus Frederick V	A	7,000	available
Grand Duchy of Oldenburg Capital: Oldenburg; area: 6,424 km^{2}
Image	Denominations	Year(s) of issue	Circulation/Commemorative coin Occasion/motif	Location of mint	Number minted
Image	Denominations	Year(s) of issue	Circulation/Commemorative coin Occasion/motif	Location of mint	MS	PF
	2 Mark	1891	Circulation coin Nicolas Frederick Peter	A	100,000	available
	2 Mark	1900–1901	Circulation coin Frederick Augustus	A	175,000	260
	5 Mark	1900–1901	Circulation coin Frederick Augustus	A	30,000	170
Kingdom of Prussia Capital: Berlin; area: 348,780 km^{2}
Image	Denominations	Year(s) of issue	Circulation/Commemorative coin Occasion/motif	Location of mint(s)	Number minted
Image	Denominations	Year(s) of issue	Circulation/Commemorative coin Occasion/motif	Location of mint(s)	MS	PF
	2 Mark	1876–1877; 1879–1880; 1883–1884	Circulation coin William I	A, B, C A A	28,827,953; 693,975; 304,640	available
	5 Mark	1874–1876	Circulation coin William I	A, B, C	7,562,000	available
	2 Mark	1888	Circulation coin Frederick III	A	500,000	available
	5 Mark	1888	Circulation coin Frederick III	A	200,000	available
	2 Mark	1888	Circulation coin William II	A	140,512	available
	5 Mark	1888	Circulation coin William II	A	56,204	available
	2 Mark	1891–1893; 1896; 1898–1908; 1911–1912	Circulation coin William II	A	1,674,000; 1,771,853; 45,395,392; 1,914,288	available
	3 Mark	1908–1912	Circulation coin William II	A	22,660,469	available
	5 Mark	1891–1896; 1898–1904; 1906–1908	Circulation coin William II	A	1,886,723; 11,273,459; 5,363,880	available
	2 Mark	1901	Commemorative coin 200th anniversary of the Kingdom of Prussia	A	2,600,000	available
	5 Mark	1901	Commemorative coin 200th anniversary of the Kingdom of Prussia	A	460,000	available
	3 Mark	1910	Commemorative coin Centenary of the University of Berlin	A	200,000	2,000
	3 Mark	1911	Commemorative coin Centenary of the University of Breslau	A	400,000	available
	2 Mark	1913	Commemorative coin Centenary of the Wars of Liberation against France	A	1,500,000	available
	3 Mark	1913	Commemorative coin Centenary of the Wars of Liberation against France	A	2,000,000	available
	2 Mark	1913	Commemorative coin 25th anniversary of the reign of William II	A	1,500,000	5,000
	3 Mark	1913	Commemorative coin 25th anniversary of the reign of William II	A	2,000,000	6,000
	3 Mark	1914	Commemorative coin 25th anniversary of the reign of William II (without laurel branch and date)	A	2,564,101	available
	5 Mark	1913–1914	Commemorative coin 25th anniversary of the reign of William II (without laurel branch and date)	A	3,548,891	available
	3 Mark	1915	Commemorative coin Centenary of the accession of the County of Mansfeld to Prussia	A	30,000	550
Principality of Reuss Elder Line Capital: Greiz; area: 316 km^{2}
Image	Denominations	Year(s) of issue	Circulation/Commemorative coin Occasion/motif	Location of mint	Number minted
Image	Denominations	Year(s) of issue	Circulation/Commemorative coin Occasion/motif	Location of mint	MS	PF
	2 Mark	1877	Circulation coin Henry XXII	B	20,000	available
	2 Mark	1892	Circulation coin Henry XXII	A	10,000	available
	2 Mark	1899; 1901	Circulation coin Henry XXII	A	10,000; 10,000	120
	3 Mark	1909	Circulation coin Henry XXIV	A	10,000	400
Principality of Reuss Younger Line Capital: Gera; area: 827 km^{2}
Image	Denominations	Year(s) of issue	Circulation/Commemorative coin Occasion/motif	Location of mint	Number minted
Image	Denominations	Year(s) of issue	Circulation/Commemorative coin Occasion/motif	Location of mint	MS	PF
	2 Mark	1884	Circulation coin Henry XIV	A	100,000	available
Kingdom of Saxony Capital: Dresden; area: 14,995 km^{2}
Image	Denominations	Year(s) of issue	Circulation/Commemorative coin Occasion/motif	Location of mint	Number minted
Image	Denominations	Year(s) of issue	Circulation/Commemorative coin Occasion/motif	Location of mint	MS	PF
	2 Mark	1876–1877; 1879–1880; 1883; 1888	Circulation coin Albert	E	2,409,431; 93,619; 55,700; 90,995	–
	5 Mark	1875–1876; 1889	Circulation coin Albert	E	1,129,109; 36,397	–
	2 Mark	1891; 1893; 1895–1896; 1898–1902	Circulation coin Albert	E	130,375; 130,375; 260,802; 1,874,049	available
	5 Mark	1891; 1893–1895; 1898–1902	Circulation coin Albert	E	52,150; 216,249; 715,964	available
	2 Mark	1902	Commemorative coin Death of Albert	E	167,625	250
	5 Mark	1902	Commemorative coin Death of Albert	E	100,000	250
	2 Mark	1903–1904	Circulation coin George	E	2,011,984	>50
	5 Mark	1903–1904	Circulation coin George	E	826,941	50
	2 Mark	1904	Commemorative coin Death of George	E	150,000	55
	5 Mark	1904	Commemorative coin Death of George	E	37,200	70
	2 Mark	1905–1908; 1911–1912; 1914	Circulation coin Frederick Augustus III	E	2,570,909; 353,875; 298,000	available
	3 Mark	1908–1913	Circulation coin Frederick Augustus III	E	3,485,188	available
	5 Mark	1907–1908; 1914	Circulation coin Frederick Augustus III	E	715,344; 298,000	available
	2 Mark	1909	Commemorative coin 500th anniversary of the University of Leipzig	E	125,000	300
	5 Mark	1909	Commemorative coin 500th anniversary of the University of Leipzig	E	50,000	300
	3 Mark	1913	Commemorative coin Centenary of the Battle of Leipzig	E	999,999	17,000
	3 Mark	1917	Commemorative coin Commemorative coin on the 400th anniversary of the Reformation in 1917	E	–	100
Duchy of Saxe-Altenburg Capital: Altenburg; area: 1,324 km^{2}
Image	Denominations	Year(s) of issue	Circulation/Commemorative coin Occasion/motif	Location of mint	Number minted
Image	Denominations	Year(s) of issue	Circulation/Commemorative coin Occasion/motif	Location of mint	MS	PF
	2 Mark	1901	Commemorative coin 75th birthday of Ernest I	A	50,000	500
	5 Mark	1901	Commemorative coin 75th birthday of Ernest I	A	20,000	500
	5 Mark	1903	Commemorative coin 50th anniversary of the reign of Ernest I	A	20,000	300
Duchies of Saxe-Coburg and Gotha Capitals: Gotha and Coburg; area: 1,956 km^{2}
Image	Denominations	Year(s) of issue	Circulation/Commemorative coin Occasion/motif	Location of mint	Number minted
Image	Denominations	Year(s) of issue	Circulation/Commemorative coin Occasion/motif	Location of mint	MS	PF
	2 Mark	1895	Circulation coin Alfred	A	15,000	available
	5 Mark	1895	Circulation coin Alfred	A	4,000	–
	2 Mark	1905; 1911	Circulation coin Charles Edward	A	10,000	2,000; 100
	5 Mark	1907	Circulation coin Charles Edward	A	10,000	–
Duchy of Saxe-Meiningen Capital: Meiningen; area: 2,468 km^{2}
Image	Denominations	Year(s) of issue	Circulation/Commemorative coin Occasion/motif	Location of mint	Number minted
Image	Denominations	Year(s) of issue	Circulation/Commemorative coin Occasion/motif	Location of mint	MS	PF
	2 Mark	1901	Commemorative coin 75th birthday of George II	D	20,000	–
	5 Mark	1901	Commemorative coin 75th birthday of George II	D	20,000	–
	2 Mark	1902; 1913	Circulation coin George II	D	20,000; 5000	available
	3 Mark	1908; 1913	Circulation coin George II	D	35,000; 20,000	available
	5 Mark	1902; 1908	Circulation coin George II	D	20,000; 60,000	–
	2 Mark	1915	Commemorative coin Death of George II	D	30,000	available
	3 Mark	1915	Commemorative coin Death of George II	D	30,000	available
Grand Duchy of Saxe-Weimar-Eisenach Capital: Weimar; area: 3,595 km^{2}
Image	Denominations	Year(s) of issue	Circulation/Commemorative coin Occasion/motif	Location of mint	Number minted
Image	Denominations	Year(s) of issue	Circulation/Commemorative coin Occasion/motif	Location of mint	MS	PF
	2 Mark	1892	Commemorative coin Golden wedding of Charles Alexander and Sophie	A	50,000	available
	2 Mark	1898	Commemorative coin 80th birthday of Charles Alexander	A	100,000	available
	2 Mark	1901	Commemorative coin Inauguration of the reign of William Ernest	A	100,000	available
	2 Mark	1903	Commemorative coin Marriage of William Ernest and Caroline	A	40,000	1,000
	5 Mark	1903	Commemorative coin Marriage of William Ernest and Caroline	A	24,000	1,000
	2 Mark	1908	Commemorative coin 350th anniversary of the University of Jena	A	50,000	–
	5 Mark	1908	Commemorative coin 350th anniversary of the University of Jena	A	40,000	–
	3 Mark	1910	Commemorative coin Marriage of William Ernest and Feodora	A	133,000	available
	3 Mark	1915	Commemorative coin Centenary of the Grand Duchy of Saxe-Weimar-Eisenach	A	50,000	200
Principality of Schaumburg-Lippe Capital: Bückeburg; area: 340 km^{2}
Image	Denominations	Year(s) of issue	Circulation/Commemorative coin Occasion/motif	Location of mint	Number minted
Image	Denominations	Year(s) of issue	Circulation/Commemorative coin Occasion/motif	Location of mint	MS	PF
	2 Mark	1898; 1904	Circulation coin George	A	5,000; 5,000	162; 200
	5 Mark	1898; 1904	Circulation coin George	A	3,000; 3,000	90; 200
	3 Mark	1911	Commemorative coin Death of George	A	50,000	available
Principality of Schwarzburg-Rudolstadt Capital: Rudolstadt; area: 941 km^{2}
Image	Denominations	Year(s) of issue	Circulation/Commemorative coin Occasion/motif	Location of mint	Number minted
Image	Denominations	Year(s) of issue	Circulation/Commemorative coin Occasion/motif	Location of mint	MS	PF
	2 Mark	1898	Circulation coin Günther Victor	A	100,000	375
Principality of Schwarzburg-Sondershausen Capital: Sondershausen; area: 862 km^{2}
Image	Denominations	Year(s) of issue	Circulation/Commemorative coin Occasion/motif	Location of mint	Number minted
Image	Denominations	Year(s) of issue	Circulation/Commemorative coin Occasion/motif	Location of mint	MS	PF
	2 Mark	1896	Circulation coin Charles Günther	A	50,000	190
	2 Mark	1905	Commemorative coin 25th anniversary of the reign of Charles Günther	A	75,000	10,000
	3 Mark	1909	Commemorative coin Death of Charles Günther	A	70,000	>100
Principalities of Waldeck and Pyrmont Capitals: Arolsen and Pyrmont; area: 1,121 km^{2}
Image	Denominations	Year(s) of issue	Circulation/Commemorative coin Occasion/motif	Location of mint	Number minted
Image	Denominations	Year(s) of issue	Circulation/Commemorative coin Occasion/motif	Location of mint	MS	PF
	5 Mark	1903	Circulation coin Frederick	A	2,000	300
Kingdom of Württemberg Capital: Stuttgart; area: 19,507 km^{2}
Image	Denominations	Year(s) of issue	Circulation/Commemorative coin Occasion/motif	Location of mint	Number minted
Image	Denominations	Year(s) of issue	Circulation/Commemorative coin Occasion/motif	Location of mint	MS	PF
	2 Mark	1876–1877; 1880; 1883; 1888	Circulation coin Charles	F	2,661,777; 128,943; 73,872; 123,140	available
	5 Mark	1874–1876; 1888	Circulation coin Charles	F	1,326,926; 49,258	available
	2 Mark	1892–1893; 1896; 1898–1908; 1912–1914	Circulation coin William II	F	351,055; 351,031; 9,115,537; 794,753	available
	3 Mark	1908–1914	Circulation coin William II	F	5,318,469
	5 Mark	1892–1895; 1898–1908; 1913	Circulation coin William II	F	361,134; 3,237,225; 401,200	available
	3 Mark	1911	Commemorative coin Silver wedding of William II and Charlotte	F	500,000	available
	3 Mark	1916	Commemorative coin 25th anniversary of the reign of William II	F	1,000	–

== Features ==
=== Embossing errors/deviations ===
The following embossing variations are known:

- A stamping error on some coins is the incorrect marginal writing OTT MIT UNS, e.g. on some 3 Mark circulation coins in Anhalt from 1909 and some 5 Mark coins from Prussia with the image of William II.
  - The 5 Mark coin of Württemberg from 1908 has the marginal writing OTT MI UNS on some coins.
- The word BADEN is written on some 5 Mark coins from Baden from 1875-1891 without a slash inside the A, i.e.: BΛDEN.
- In the case of the Baden 5 Mark circulation coins from 1913, it happens that the D in BADEN is open at the top.
- Otto's curls on Bavaria's 2 and 5 Mark coins from 1888 to 1913:
  - Open/closed forelock: Otto's originally closed forelock became an open forelock due to the polishing of the die.
  - Curls above the ear: Due to stamping differences, there are either multiple curls or one large curl above the ear.
- 2 and 5 Mark Saxe-Meiningen: The 2 and 5 Mark coins of Saxe-Meiningen have two different variants:
  - The Duke's beard is approximately 1.5 mm from the bead circle.
  - The beard touches the beading.

=== Other features ===
- Bremen originally wanted to mint a 3 Mark coin in 1914. However, the outbreak of the First World War prevented this.
- Mecklenburg-Schwerin had planned to mint 2 and 5 mark coins in 1919 for the 500th anniversary of the University of Rostock.

In Prussia, in 1915, a commemorative coin was planned for Bismarck's 100th birthday.

The fact that, due to high demand, the number of coins would have exceeded 100 million and thus been higher than the mintage of either the Wars of Liberation coin or the coin marking the 25th anniversary of William II's reign (about 9 million) demonstrated Bismarck's greater popularity than the Emperor's, which is why the plan was dropped.

== See also ==
- List of commemorative coins of Germany
- Mark (1871)
- Reichsmark

== Literature ==
Basis of the article

- Jaeger, K. and H. Kahnt (2009). Die deutschen Münzen seit 1871. 21st edn., Regenstauf: Gietl, ISBN 978-3-86646-521-3.

Other sources

- MICHEL: Münzen-Katalog Deutschland 2009. Schwaneberger, Unterschleißheim 2009, ISBN 978-3-87858-589-3.
- P. Arnold, H. Küthmann, D. Steinhilber, D. Faßbender: Großer Deutscher Münzkatalog von 1800 bis heute. Gietl, Regenstauf 2008, ISBN 978-3-86646-035-5.
- H. Caspar: Der König rief, und alle, alle kamen: Ein Streifzug durch die Münzgeschichte des deutschen Kaiserreichs 1871 bis 1918. money trend Verlag, Wien 2009, ISBN 978-3-9502268-7-4.
