= US error coins =

Type of collectible coin

US error coins are error coins produced by the US government. There are three categories of error coins as provided by the American Numismatic Association. Metal usage and striking errors referred to widely as planchet errors, die errors, and mint striking errors. This does not include the varieties that the US Mint has issued over the years.

Since the inception of coin collecting there has been much controversy over what constitutes a true mint error. An organization of coin collectors named the Combined Organizations of Numismatic Error Collectors of America (CONECA) was created that specifically deals with mint errors.

== Planchet errors ==
A planchet is produced by punching blanks in sheet metal stock specially made for the types of mint blanks required. After the blanks are punched they are rolled on the edge placing an upset needed for the minting process. The blanks are then washed and annealed making them ready for the minting process

There are several types of planchet errors that include: improper alloy, wrong stock, imperfect blank, and lamination.

A planchet error may be caused by an improper alloy mixture. Improper alloy mixtures occur when the sheet stock contains uneven layers of the metals intended for the type of coin that is produced. A result of improper layers of metals is a coin produced without an intended surface layer of nickel. A dime or quarter without the nickel layer will contain only the copper alloy mixture.

A planchet error can be caused by using a blank intended for a different denomination or wrong stock. The result of using a blank intended for another denomination is the minting of the intended obverse and reverse on the wrong stock.

A planchet error also refers to many types of issues where an imperfect blank has been used. Pieces of the blank might be missing causing a half moon to be missing from the coin. Collectors denote missing parts of the planchet as "clipped planchets." A dirty or oily blank may cause the details of the coin to become dull or even missing. A piece of debris may find its way into the dies causing a series of lines to be minted on the surface of the coin.

A planchet may be in a state that causes peeling on the surface of the coin. The peeling of any part of the surface of a coin is known as a lamination error.

Below is a lamination error on a Jefferson nickel.

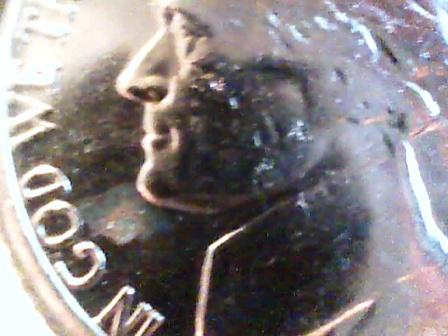
Jefferson nickel with minor planchet error

== Die errors ==
Die errors are caused by the mint dies wearing down over time or dies that have not been prepared identical to others that have been replaced. The result of preparing a set of new dies improperly from the original hub results in coin errors such as doubling, extra details, or missing details on the surface of the coin.

A die break is caused when the mint die suffers a crack and this crack feature is transposed onto the coins in the minting process. Coins minted with a die break have a thin line or lines that are raised running across the surface of the coin. Below is a photograph of a 1954-S Jefferson nickel with a die crack along the top of the portrait of Jefferson.

A die break can create coins that have deep impressions in a coin that is filled in with metal. The coin shows a raised patch of metal were the break occurred. This type of error is commonly known as a "cud" error. Gouges in coins caused by flaws in dies, and die polishing mistakes resulting in coins minted with surface indentations, or polishing lines.

Dies that are damaged and used in the minting process also create errors resulting in coins having die chips embedded in the surface of the coin.

A die clash occurs when a planchet is not fed into the collar that holds the coin in place for the minting process. The two dies meet and each carries away part of the design embedded on the die. Coins minted using these dies cause coins to be minted with parts of the reverse design on the obverse or parts of the obverse on the reverse of the coin. Die rotations cause coins to be minted with the reverse or obverse of the coin partially or fully rotated. A die rotation occurs when the dies become loose and they then turn.

When a mint worker polishes a die to remove a die clash or some other defect there may be instances where a part of the design is removed. The 3-legged Buffalo nickel was the direct result of die polishing and the removal of a leg. The 1970 Lincoln cent with the raised 7 is also the result of die polishing.

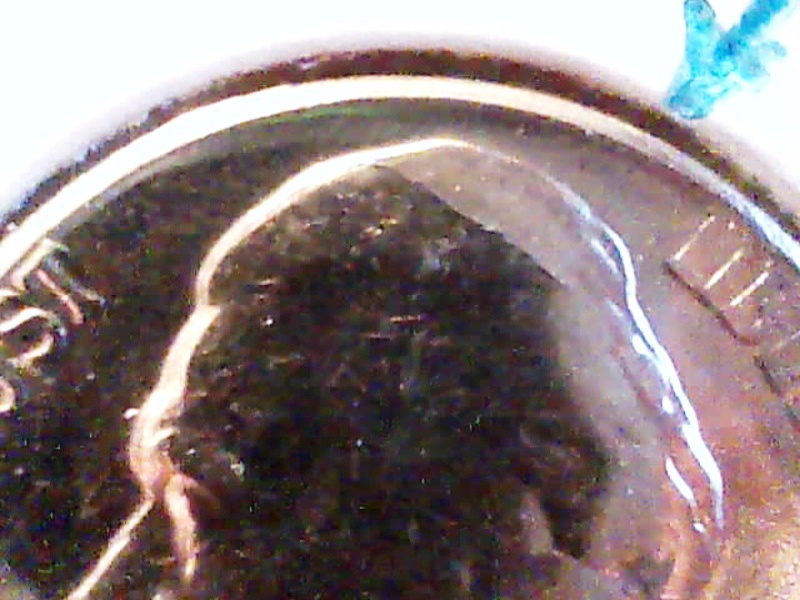
Jefferson nickel with a die crack

Before 1990, all US coin dies were subject to mint mark errors resulting from the preparation of the dies. The mint mark was hammered into the die manually sometimes causing a die to have a doubling. In the minting process this would create a series of coins with a distinct of slight doubling of the mint mark. Millions of these errors can be located on the internet for sale and are referred to as RPM's or repunched mint mark.

== Doubled dies ==
Doubled die coins are mainly created by a defective hub which is used to create many dies for the minting process. Collectors classify doubled dies as DDO (doubled die obverse coins), DDR (doubled die reverse) and OMM (over mint mark).

The over mint mark is created when a one date and mint mark is punched over another date, part of a date, or mint mark. These coins are generally restricted to the early minting process of coins dating before the turn of the century.

The DDO and DDR errors are related to any part of the coin that shows a distinct doubling. Pictured below is a 1969-S doubled die Lincoln cent.

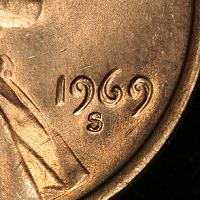
1969-S doubled die cent

== Mint striking errors ==
Collectors and organizations dedicated to collecting coins regard mint striking errors as those that have been created by the minting process. Mint striking errors are caused by the collar moving, cracking, or not being present in the minting process. The collar is a third die that actually holds the coin in place in the minting process. It is the collar that imprints the lettering on a coin, such as the lettering on the Presidential dollars.

Striking a coin with debris causes an indentation on the coin or the actual debris stamped into the coin.

In order to mint any US coin a retaining collar is used to keep the coin in place while it is pressed between the dies. If the retaining collar breaks or is missing, the coin is struck so that the metal of the planchet is actually expanded outward producing a larger version of the coin with most of the details present. This error is known as a broad struck error.

A coin that has been struck out of the collar and has double details such as two partial portraits, one normal and one that is overlapping and extending outside the normal circumference of the coin is denoted as a double striking error.

A brockage results when a coin is stuck in the collar and another planchet enters the collar and is pressed against the coin already minted. The details of the coins produced have the appearance of mirror images of the obverse and reverse.

A die cap is a coin that has been stamped a number of times and has the appearance of a soda cap. Metal flows around the side of the coin and the portrait appears deep in the coin.

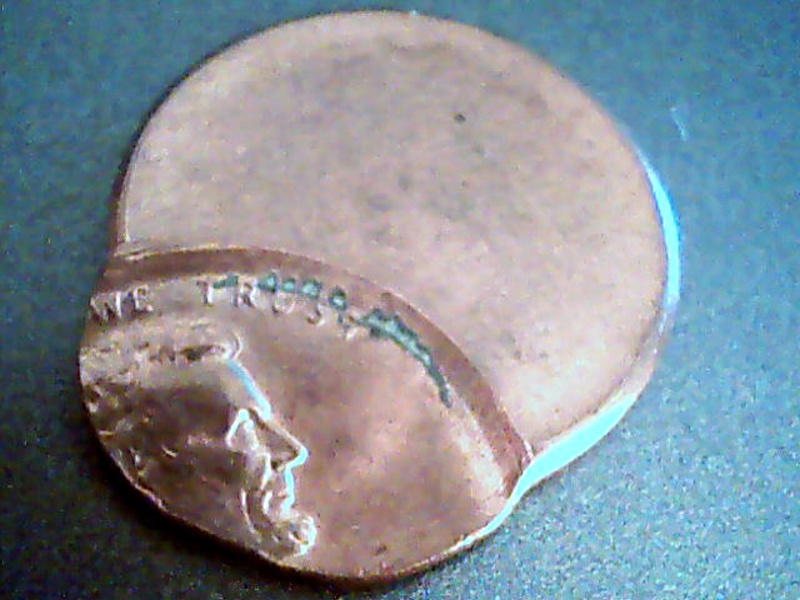
Lincoln cent off center

== Variations ==
Variations are not mint errors in the technical sense. Variations in coins are caused by creating hubs and dies that are not exactly the same resulting in dates that can be compared as large to small, wide to thin etc. These die variations resulted in the 1960 large- and small-dated Lincoln cent, and the 1982 large- and small-dated series both in copper and copper-zinc cents minted.

Below are photographs of two Brilliant Uncirculated Jefferson nickels. Note that these are variations of dies used to mint the 1970-D Jefferson nickels. The die variation is clearly evident with the placement of the D in two different locations, one closest to the 1970 and the other closest to the rim of the coin.

There are some variations created by the mint site using different die sets. The best case of the mint using different die sets is the variation of the letters AM on the Lincoln cent. The AM letters are either touching or are distinctly apart in some Lincoln cents minted in 1998, 1999, 2000, and perhaps others to be discovered. Normally, the wide AM design is reserved for the Lincoln proof designs. Below is a photograph of a wide AM Lincoln cent.

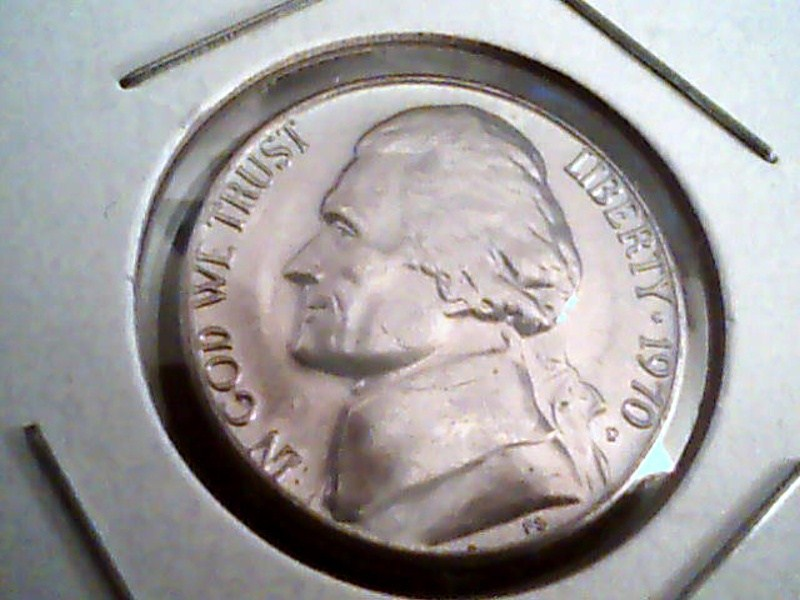
1970-D Jefferson nickel High D

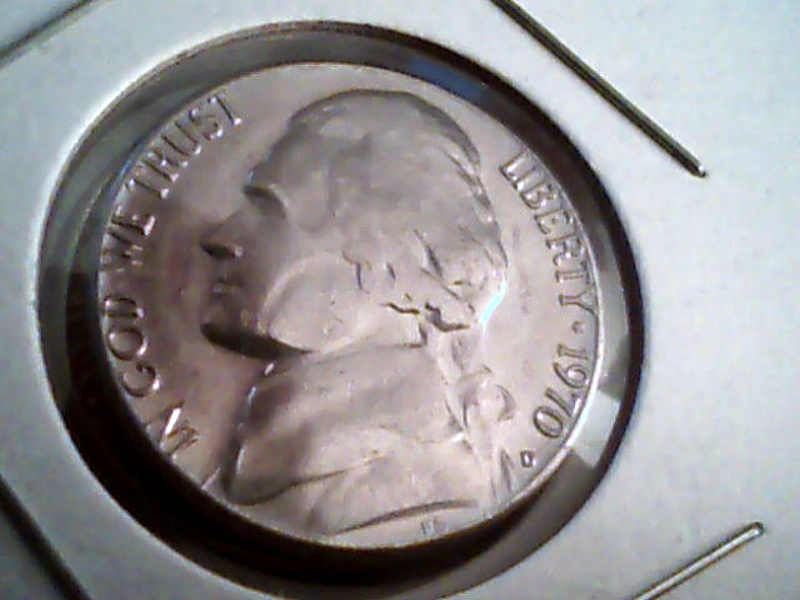
1970-D Jefferson nickel Low D

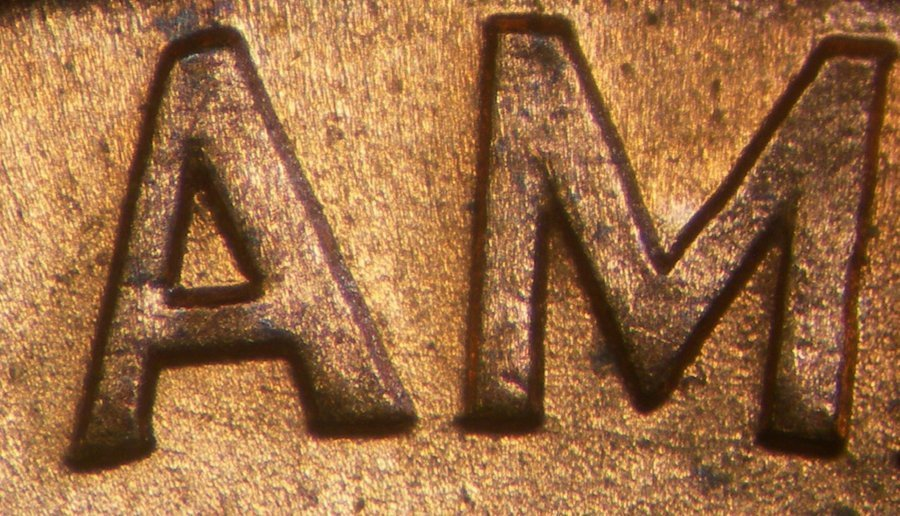
Lincoln Cent Wide AM design

== Unclassified error coins ==
Unclassified error coins are those that are difficult to categorize. Below are two unclassified error, one with the date flattened in a 1998 Jefferson nickel and another Jefferson nickel with a recessed S.

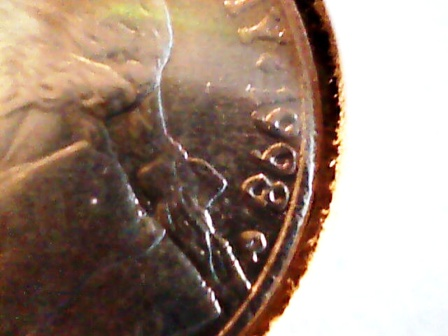
1998-P Jefferson nickel with flat date

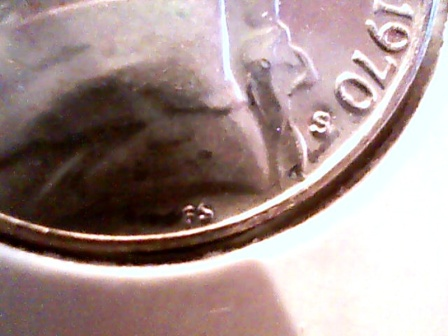
1970-S Jefferson nickel with a recessed S

== Counter stamped coins ==
Counter stamped coins have a long history in the early days of minted coins. Many companies used counter stamping as a method to advertise their company. There are thousands of counter stamped coins some of which carry little value while others command values in the thousands. In any case, these coins were changed after leaving the mint, and are not true error coins.

Initials were sometime cut into coins. Some of these coins have been classified as "love tokens" having the initials of the person who counter stamped the coin. Below is a counter stamped Lincoln cent with a number 2 in a bar shape outline. This coin was found with some others with personal initials in a 5,000 piece coin bag purchased from a coin show.

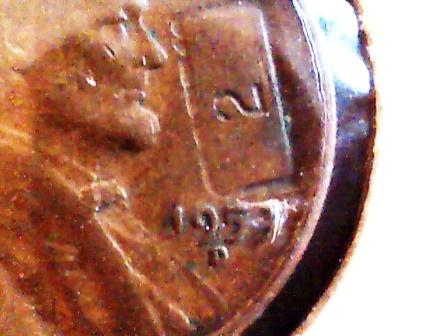
Lincoln Cent with Counter Stamped 2

== See also ==
- Coin collecting
- Mint-made errors
- Doubled die
- Coining (mint)
- Die-deterioration doubling
- Wavy step
- Die defect
