= Die defect =

A die defect is a unique and unintentional flaw in a coin die and is created through excessive use or polishing of the die. A die bearing such a defect is occasionally referred to as a defective die. Generally, and depending upon the magnitude of the defect, coins that are produced from these dies are considered error coins. Also, the term encompasses a wide variety of design errors that were engraved into the die originally and were slipped into circulation before the incorrect design was discovered.

== Types ==
=== Die crack ===
A die crack occurs when a die, after being subjected to immense pressure during the minting process, cracks, causing a small gap in the die. If this damaged die continues to produce coins, the metal will fill into the crack, thus revealing a raised line of metal in the finished coin. Specimens with more prominent die cracks can command a high premium and are valued greatly by some collectors. However, less obvious errors are quite common, especially in the 50 States Commemorative Quarter Program, yielding a lower value.

=== Cud ===
A cud on a coin is a damaged area resembling a blob at the edge of the coin. Cuds result from a piece of the perimeter of the die breaking away. They can be any shape depending on the shape of the piece that broke off the die.

== See also ==
- Coining (mint)
- Die-deterioration doubling
- Doubled die
- Wavy step
- US error coins
- Mint-made errors
