= Glossary of numismatics =

This glossary of numismatics is a list of definitions of terms and concepts relevant to numismatics and coin collecting, as well as sub-fields and related disciplines, with concise explanations for the beginner or professional.

Numismatics (Ancient Greek: νομισματική, meaning 'monetary') is the scientific study of money and its history in all its varied forms. While numismatists are often characterized as studying coins, the discipline also includes the study of other types of money, such as banknotes, stock certificates, medals, medallions, and tokens.

Sub-fields and related fields of numismatics include:

- Exonumia, the study of coin-like objects such as token coins and medals, and other items used in place of legal currency or for commemoration.
- Notaphily, the study of paper money or banknotes.
- Philately, the study of postage stamps.
- Scripophily, the study and collection of company share certificates and bonds.

== A ==
actual silver weight
Actual amount of silver in a "silver" coin: the mass of the coin multiplied by its fineness.
adjustment
The filing down of a blank to the correct mass before striking, shown by file marks. File marks are often still visible on the surface of a coin even after being struck.
alliance coinage
Coins minted by two or more state governments in cooperation. Examples include the euro coins.
alloy
A homogeneous mixture of two or more chemical elements, where the resulting compound has metallic properties. Common coin alloys include cupro-nickel (copper and nickel) and bronze (copper and tin).
altered date
A false date put on a coin to defraud collectors, usually to make it appear more valuable. Such alterations are often easily spotted with the aid of a magnifying glass.
anepigraphic coin
A coin without an epigraph or inscription. Many ancient coins used only a simple picture of an animal to show value or weight.
annealing
The process of repeatedly heating and cooling metal in order to relieve stresses. This is often done with coin blanks to make the metal less brittle before striking.
assay
A test to ascertain the weight and purity of a coin.
ASW
See term "actual silver weight", above.
attribution
An identifier of a coin, such as date, mint, denomination, or variety.

== B ==
bag mark

A surface mark, or nick, on a coin, usually from contact with other coins in a mint bag. More often seen on large gold or silver coins.
banker's mark
A small countermark applied to a coin by a bank or a trader indicating that they consider the coin to be genuine and of legal weight. These are found on ancient and medieval coins as well as on silver coins which circulated in China and Japan, where they are referred to as chop-marks.
base metal
Any non-precious metal or alloy that does not contain gold or silver. Common base metals used in coinage include nickel and copper.
beading
A raised dot border along the rim of a coin.
billon
A low-grade alloy of gold or silver with a high percentage of another metal, usually copper. Billon is often produced in response to a sudden debasing of circulating silver coinage due to hyperinflation.
bi-metallic coin
A coin with one type of metal in the center with an outer ring of a different metal. Examples are the 1 and 2 Euro coins and the Canadian "toonie" two-dollar coin.
blank

1. A prepared disk of metal on which the design for a coin will be stamped.
2. The un-struck or flat side of a uniface coin or medal.
brass
A copper-based alloy with zinc.
brockage
Originally referring to metal wasted in coin production, now means coins struck when the previous coin remains stuck to a die, creating an incuse impression in the next struck coin (primarily found in ancient coins).
bronze

A copper-based alloy with tin.
bullion
Precious metals (platinum, gold and silver) in the form of bars, ingots or plate, or in any context where weight is considered as a valuation.
bullion coin
Precious metals in the form of coins whose market value is determined by metallic content rather than scarcity.
bullion value
The current market value of the raw precious metal content of a coin. For example, the bullion value for Canadian silver coins minted between 1920 and 1966 is 12 times the face value when silver is $20.00 per troy ounce.
business strike
A coin intended for everyday use in commerce.

== C ==
cameo
A strong distinction in the surface appearance of foreground devices relative to the field. Proof coins often exhibit this feature.
carat
A unit measurement of the weight of precious stones. See karat for the unit of measurement of the purity of gold.
cast coins
Coins produced by pouring metal into a mold. Used for the first Ancient Roman bronze as coins and Chinese cash coins, but rarely used today. Modern counterfeit coins are often cast.
centum
One one-hundredth of the basic monetary unit of a currency system. Originally a Latin term, there are many variations in modern languages, including the English cent and Romance languages centavos, centimos, centesimos or centimes. Each of these units is valued at one one-hundredth of its corresponding base unit, such as the dollar, euro, peso, etc.
certified coin
A coin that has been graded and authenticated by one of numerous independent grading services. See also encapsulated coin.
chop-mark
See banker's mark.
church tokens

Tokens generally issued initially by Scottish parishes (die stamped one-side only to show the parish) and later in the United States and Canada. They were square or oblong, made of lead, iron or brass and measured 1/4" (0.635 mm) to 1" (2.54 mm).
circulated
A term used to indicate a coin that has wear.
clad coinage
Issues of coins using cladding with a center core and an outer layer of differing metals or alloys bonded together. The current U.S. Quarter, dime, and half dollar are made of cupronickel-clad copper.
clipping coins
Coin clipping is the removal of, usually, precious metal from the edge of a coin using shears or a similar tool for fraudulent purposes. The removed metal is accumulated as bullion and sold or used to make counterfeit coins.
coin alignment
The term used to describe the positions of the obverse (front) and reverse (back) designs relative to each other. A medal alignment describes a coin struck so that when the obverse side is facing upright, and the coin is turned on its vertical axis, the reverse side is also facing upright. A coin alignment describes a coin struck so that when the obverse side is facing upright, the coin must be flipped top-to-bottom to see the reverse side facing upright. U.S. coins are struck with coin alignment.
collar
The outer ring of the die chamber that holds the blank in place while the obverse and reverse are being stamped.
contact marks
Minor abrasions on uncirculated coinage created by contact with other coins. Also called bag marks.
countermark

Partial or complete over-stamping of a coin or token in order to change its value or issuing authority, or to display an advertisement, political slogan or symbol, etc. Stamping may consist of a number (value), symbol (authority), letters (advertisement or slogan), or any combination of the above.
crown
A large coin often struck in precious metal. Modern crowns are usually not highly circulated due to being too large and/or too heavy. The United States' last crown-sized coin minted for circulation was the Eisenhower Dollar, last struck in 1978.
cud
A defect in which a coin has raised metal near its edge. It is caused by a chipped die.

== D ==
debase
To lower the silver/gold value of the coin by altering its purity, but with the same face value as the pure coin. This often happens during periods of high inflation.
denticles
Small, decorative tooth-like projecting points on the inside edge of a coin.
designer
The artist or creator of a coin's design.
device
A pattern or emblem used in the design of a coin.
die
An engraved metal piece used for transferring the design to the coin. In a vertical arrangement, the upper (or hammer) die is typically used for the obverse. The lower (or anvil) die is stationary and is used for the reverse. The arrangement may also be horizontal.
die clash
Caused when a coin planchet fails to be placed between two dies during the minting process, causing the dies to smash together. The design of one or both may impress into the opposite die, causing a "shadow" of the design to appear on subsequent coins minted with the damaged dies. The impact of the two dies may also result in die cracks or defects.
die crack
A fine raised line on a coin that was caused by a crack in the die.
die defect
An imperfection of various sorts caused by a damaged die. May refer to a crack or clash or a chip out of the die, etc. A defect from a chipped die is called a cud.
die marriage
The combination of a particular obverse and reverse set of dies. If one die is replaced, a new die marriage is created.
die sinker
A die sinker, a term used primarily in the eighteenth and nineteenth centuries, created dies by engraving, punching, finishing, etc.
die state
A variation in the appearance of a coin struck by a single die, resulting from wear or alteration of the die. For example, the presence or absence of die cracks may signal a specific die state.
die variety
A minor variation in a die, including repunched mintmarks, doubling or deliberate minor changes to the die design.
dime
A coin issued in the United States worth $0.10 (ten cents). While the term dime is American in origin, Canadians often use the term as well.
dipping
The chemical cleaning of a coin with a diluted acid. This "cleanliness" is a result of the surface of the coin being dissolved by the acid. Dipped coins almost always have a lower numismatic value than when they were in their former "dirty" state, hence most numismatists do not recommend dipping or any other method of cleaning coins as doing so will likely reduce the coin's value.
Double Eagle
(U.S.A.) A gold coin struck in the United States from 1850 to 1933, worth $20.00.

Example of extreme doubling on the date of a coin

double strike
A coin where a die is struck, bounced, and then struck again slightly offset from first strike (common on ancient and medieval coins where hubs were not used), resulting in a coin with a "doubled" image.
doubled die
A die that received two misaligned impressions from a hub; more commonly, a coin struck by such a die.
doubloon
The popular name of a Spanish gold coin originally valued at 4 dollars. The formal term was "2 escudos".
dump
(Australia) The centre of the holey dollar with a value of fifteen pence.

== E ==
Eagle
1. (U.S.A.) A gold coin minted in the United States from 1795 to 1933, worth $10.00.
2. (U.S.A.) A series of bullion coins minted in the United States from 1986 through the present.
edge
The surface of the coin between the faces; the edge may be plain, ridged or patterned with lettering or other decoration.
ecu
A large French silver coin made during the end of the monarchy. Also a proposed European currency unit.
effigy
The image or likeness of a person, usually depicted on the obverse of a coin or medal.
electrotype
A reproduction made by electrodeposition, frequently used in museum displays.
electrum

An artificial or naturally occurring alloy of gold and silver, used in some of the world's first coinage.
elongated coin
An oval medalet produced by a roller die using a coin, token or medal as a planchet, usually a cent.
encapsulated coin
A coin that has been authenticated, graded and enclosed in plastic by an independent service.
engraver
A person who cuts the image of a design onto a die.
error
An error that occurs in the production of a coin, for example, due to an engraving or die-cutting error. Coin errors are often unique, although engraving errors can appear on all of the coins produced until the error is corrected resulting in error varieties.
essai, essay
A trial strike, also in currency a strike intended to test the design.
exergue

A segment of a coin design separated by a line (usually indicating the ground in the design) in which a legend is placed/inscribed.

== F ==
face value
The value that is written on a coin. For example, an American one-cent coin has a face value of 1 cent. A collectable coin or bullion coin is usually worth many times its face value.
fantasy issue
unofficial coin or paper note (not legal tender) made to honor a person or event, for advertising purposes, for humor, for artistic purposes, or to show how it might have looked had it been actually issued.
field
The background area of a coin not used for a design or inscription.
filler
A coin that is very worn and/or damaged, but may still be included in a collection if it is a key coin.
fineness
Purity of precious metal content expressed in terms of one thousand parts, e.g. 90% pure is expressed as .900 fine. The purest gold bullion coin is .99999 fine.
flan
See blank.
fleur de coin (FDC)
A coin of exceptionally high quality, where quality is determined not just by wear of the coin in circulation but also by the wear and artistic quality of the dies from which it was minted. These factors are crucial for ancient coinage where variability was higher than in modern mints. See also grade.
flip strike
An error caused by the coin flipping over after being struck, and then struck a second time, resulting in each face of the coin showing a "ghost" of the opposite face.

== G ==
gem
A coin of exceptionally high quality or good condition, such as Gem Uncirculated or Gem Proof.
grade
The condition of a coin or the amount of wear that a coin has received. Common grade terms used in North America, from worst to best, are Poor (Po), Fair (Fr), About Good (AG), Good (G), Very Good (VG), Fine (F), Very Fine (VF), Extra/Extremely Fine (EF or XF), Almost Uncirculated (AU), Uncirculated (UNC), and Brilliant Uncirculated (BU). Grading criteria may also include color, strength of strike, and "eye appeal".

== H ==
Hacksilver
Fragments of cut and bent silver items that were used as bullion or as currency by weight in antiquity.
Hairlines
Small scratches or lines on coins, often caused by the process of cleaning or polishing.
hammered
A coin that has been struck by hand, using dies and a hammer.
high relief
A coin with the raised design high above the field. Coins struck in high relief often have problems with details not coming up sharp enough and dies having a shorter than usual lifespan. If the design is higher than the rim, the coin may not be stackable, and the highest points of the design will wear away very quickly.
holey dollar
(Australia) A Spanish eight-real coin with a hole in the centre, stamped with New South Wales 1813 on the obverse and five shilling on the reverse.
hub
A positive-image punch that impresses a coin's design onto a die.

== I ==
incuse
Part of the coin's design that has been impressed below the surface (intaglio). Not as popular as the "relief" method due to the difficulty of striking clearly and the shorter lifespan of dies.
ingot
A bar of pure metal formed by pouring the molten metal into a mould. It may be stamped with its weight and purity.
inscription
Lettering or wording on a coin.
intrinsic value
The current market value of a coin based on its metallic content. For a coin struck on precious metals, this is the same as its bullion value.

== K ==
karat
A unit measurement of the purity of gold. Usually marked K or k; 24K is pure gold, 18K is .750 fine. Not to be confused with the similar term carat, which is used with precious stones. Both terms originally referred to the seed of the carob tree (Ceratonia siliqua or Siliqua Graeca). A Roman coin called the solidus weighed 24 "carats" or "siliquae", 1/6 of a scruple, which eventually became the standard of purity in Western Europe.
key coin
A rarer or higher valued coin within a series. As an example, 1923 and 1925 are key coins in the Canadian small cent series.

== L ==
laureate

A style of coin portraiture started in ancient Rome whose coins often showed the Emperor's head crowned with a laurel wreath. The American Barber coins from 1892 to 1915 and the first portrait of Queen Elizabeth II used in Great Britain from 1953 to 1967 are modern examples.
legal tender
Coins or currency which must be accepted in payment of debt.
legend
The principal inscription on a coin.
lettered edge
The outside edge of a coin containing an inscription.
low relief
A coin with the raised design not very high above the field.
luster
The appearance of a coin's ability to reflect light; brilliance. Percentage of the original mint luster is one of the factors in determining grades of "Mint State" coins (e.g. MS-60, MS-65).

== M ==
master die
An original die from which working hubs are made.
Maundy money
An annual gift made on Maundy Thursday of a set of pure silver coins made by the Royal Mint and distributed personally by the monarch to the poor of Canterbury. The number of sets distributed reflects the age of the monarch at the time.
medal alignment
A method of striking coins in which both the obverse and reverse dies are aligned in the same direction. For example, British and most other Commonwealth coinage, Japanese coinage, and Euro coinage have medallic orientation. Contrast coin alignment.
medal-coin
See NCLT.
milled coinage
Machine-struck coinage. In contrast to hammered coinage and cast coinage.
milled edge

The edge of a coin with grooved lines around the perimeter.
mint
An industrial facility which manufactures coins.
mint error
A defective coin produced by a mint.
mint luster
The shiny "frost" on the surface of an uncirculated or mint state coin.
mint mark
A small letter or other symbol inscribed on a coin, indicating at which mint the coin was struck. Examples are "S" for San Francisco on U.S. coins, or "A" for Paris on French coins.
mint roll
Newly minted coins wrapped in rolls of a certain quantity, by the mint or issuing authority.
mint set
A set of uncirculated coins packaged and sold by a mint.
Mint State (MS)
Another term for uncirculated or fleur de coin, usually used in North America. Conditions range from MS-60 to MS-70.
mis-strike
An off-centre striking of a coin.
monster box
A large plastic shipping box for silver bullion coins, holding 500 coins. U.S. Silver Eagles are shipped in green monster boxes while Canadian Maple Leafs are shipped in red monster boxes.
motto
An inspirational phrase or wording. Examples include "In God We Trust" inscribed on U.S. currency, or "Liberté, égalité, fraternité" inscribed on French currency.
mule
A coin struck from two dies never intended to be used together.

== N ==
NCLT
Non-circulating legal tender. These coins are issued in "limited editions" for collectors and are typically sold for far more than their face value. While these coins are technically legal tender, their bullion value usually far exceeds their face value.
Notgeld
"emergency money" or "necessity money" refers to money issued by an institution in a time of economic or political crisis.

== O ==
obverse

The front or "heads" side of a coin.
oroide
A copper alloy with a gold appearance. Also known as goldene or goldine.
overdate
A date shown made by superimposing numbers on a previously dated die.
overgraded
A coin in worse condition than stated.
overstrike
An impression with new dies on a previously struck coin.

== P ==
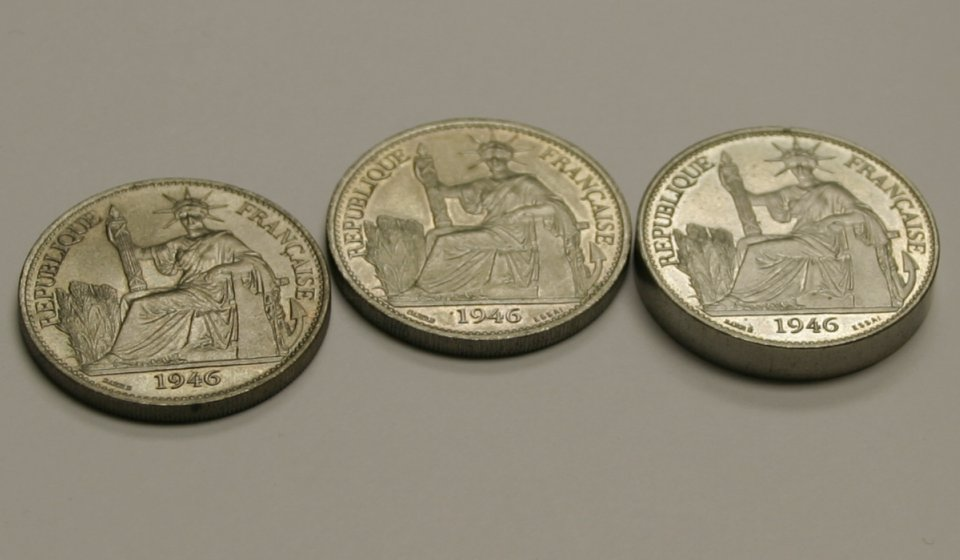
Regular coin, essai (pattern) and piedfort

Pattern
A coin minted from official dies that is not a regular issue, and intended to evaluate new alloys or designs. Patterns can be divided in three categories.
1. A coin which represents a new design, motto, or denomination, proposed but not adopted, at least for the same year. Most of the unadopted designs fit into this modality.
2. Die trials: A coin made with the regular issue dies, in metals other than the proper. Usually minted to verify details of a new coin, value or design.
3. Experimental pieces: A very similar process to "die trials", but with subtle differences. A coin minted with a die, official or not, to try a new metal, alloy, or shape.
patina
A surface film caused by oxidation, usually green or brown, mostly found on older silver, copper or bronze coins.
pedigree
The provenance or record of previous owners of a coin.
piedfort
A coin struck on a planchet that is thicker than normal, typically twice as thick. "Piefort" is a common misspelling.
planchet
A blank prepared piece of metal on which the coin is struck.
pocket piece
A coin kept on one’s person for sentiment, luck, or as a conversation piece.
portrait
The obverse (front-side) image.
post-mint damage
Damage or alteration to a coin that occurs after minting. May be mistaken for a true error coin.
privy mark
A small mark, often hidden, on a coin, traditionally to indicate the mintmaster or moneyer.
proclamation coins
Coins declared legal tender even though they are not issued by the sovereign, but by another sovereign.

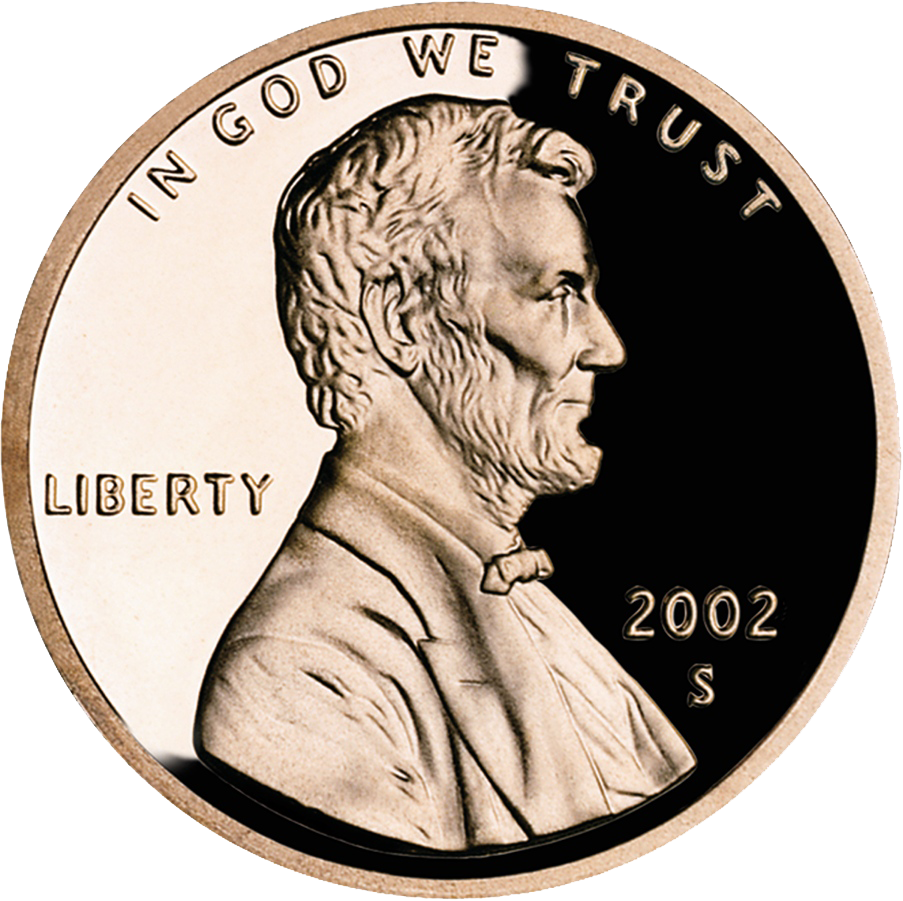
2002 Lincoln cent, obverse, proof with cameo

proof
Coins specially struck for collectors using polished dies and planchets. The resulting coins usually have a mirror field and raised areas are frosted in appearance.
proof set
A set of proof coins packaged and sold by the mint.
punch mark
A coin struck from "punching" the coin with symbols or a seal, e.g. five punch marked coins of ancient India. Punch marks generally represent animals, tree, hills, and human figures. These coins were issued by royal authority and generally marked with banker's punches on the reverse.

== Q ==
Quarter
(U.S.A./Canada) A coin issued in the United States or Canada, worth $0.25 (twenty-five cents). Short for "Quarter Dollar".
Quarter Eagle
(U.S.A.) A gold coin issued in the United States, worth $2.50 (two dollars and fifty cents).

== R ==
raw
A coin that has not been encapsulated by any coin grading service.
reeded edge
See milled edge.
relief
The part of the coin's design that is raised above the field, opposite of incuse.
re-strike
A coin struck from genuine dies at a date later than the original issue. Some of the 1804 U.S. Silver Dollars were re-strikes.
repunched date
A coin variety on which the puncheon with which the date is applied to the hub has been used a second time, often to cover a first, failed attempt.
reverse

The back or "tails" side of a coin. The opposite of obverse.
reverse proof
A proof coin that has its fields frosted and the design and lettering with a mirror finish. Standard proof coins have the fields mirrored and the design and lettering frosted.
rim
The raised portion of the design along the edge that protects the coin from wear. It also makes the coins stackable and easy to roll by machine.
round
A round, one-ounce bullion piece, generally issued privately.

== S ==
series
A set of years in which a coin was minted with a specific design and denomination.
scruple
One Roman scruple is equal to 1/24 Roman uncia; the modern (nominal) estimate of the weight of the Roman scruple is 1.125 grams.
seigniorage
The difference between the face value of a money and the cost to produce and distribute it. When a government issues new coinage, it earns the seigniorage in profit (or loss if negative).
silver dollar
A one-dollar coin minted in the United States until 1935, and in Canada until 1967. Dollar coins made after those dates are also sometimes called "silver dollars", although they are actually made of nickel or other metal. Dollar coins struck in Canada since 1987 are more commonly referred to as loonies because of the loon design on the reverse.
slab
The plastic case containing a coin that has been graded and encapsulated.
Spanish dollar

A coin issued in Spain and its colonies from 1497 to 1864, equal to eight reales. It was legal tender in the United States until 1857.
spot price
In numismatics quoted market value of one troy ounce of a precious metal in bullion form.
stainless steel
An alloy of iron, carbon and another element, usually chromium, that is resistant to rusting. Coins struck on stainless steel are very durable and maintain their shiny appearance, but the hardness of the metal requires that the coins have a low relief in order to prolong die life.

== T ==
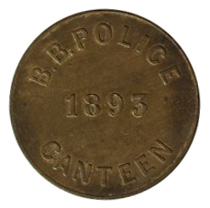
A rare and historic Bechuanaland Border Police canteen token

token
A privately issued piece that has redeemable value for goods or services but is not an official government coin. An example is a subway token.
tombac
A brass alloy that was used to make Canadian 5-cent coins in 1942 and 1943, during which there was a shortage of the usual nickel due to World War II. A shortage of copper forced a switch to chromium-plated steel in 1944.
trade dollar
Silver dollar issued specifically for trade with a foreign country.
truncation
The sharply cut off bottom edge of a portrait or bust. The coin engraver's initials are often found on the truncation.
type
A coin's basic distinguishing design.
type set
One of each coin of a particular design, series, or time period.

== U ==
uncirculated
A coin that has never been used, thus retaining all or most of its original luster.
uniface
A coin struck with the design on one side only.
union
A proposed United States gold coin worth $100 (one hundred dollars). Only one pattern "half union" is known to exist. Platinum $100 coins are not technically "unions".
unique
An item of which only one is known to exist.
upset
A coin struck on which the obverse and reverse are out of alignment.

== V ==
variety
Fine details of a coin's design which set it apart from the normal issue. Varieties arise as a result of intended (die variety) or unintended (mint-made error) alterations to the basic coin design that occur during the die production stage.

== Y ==
year set
A set of coins for any specific year containing one of each denomination of that year.

== Z ==
zinc
A grey, inexpensive metal, usually alloyed with copper to make brass coins, but also used in pure form for emergency coinage when the usual coinage metal is not available due to war or other serious crisis. Much of the coinage struck in Nazi-occupied Europe was tin-plated zinc.

== Bibliography ==
- Coin World Glossary (7 April 2007)
- Dictionary.com
- A Guide Book of United States Coins by R.S. Yeoman ISBN 0-7948-1790-4
- 2005 Blackbook Price Guide to United States Paper Money ISBN 1-4000-4839-7
- "Numismatic Terms and Methods" from the American Numismatic Society (archived 19 February 2007)
- The Complete Illustrated Guide to Coins & Coin Collecting by Dr. James Mackay, ISBN 0-681-45952-2.
