= Cud (disambiguation) =

Cud is the portion of food regurgitated by a ruminant.

Cud or CUD may also refer to:

- Cámara Uruguaya de Productores de Fonogramas y Videogramas, a Uruguayan non-profit organization
- Cannabis use disorder
- Coalition for Unity and Democracy, an Ethiopian political party
- Connected Urban Development, a private/public partnership, initiated in 2006
- Cud (band), an indie rock band formed in Leeds, England in 1987
- Cud, a lump of metal on a coin caused by a die defect
- Cursor Down (ANSI), an ANSI X3.64 escape sequence
- Primary carnitine deficiency, an inability to utilize fat for energy
- Caloundra Airport, IATA airport code "CUD"

== See also ==
- CUDA, a parallel computing architecture
- Digestion
