= Wavy steps and trails =

Minting error on US coins

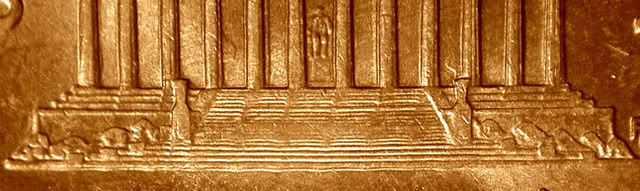
Wavy steps on a 1999 Lincoln cent reverse.

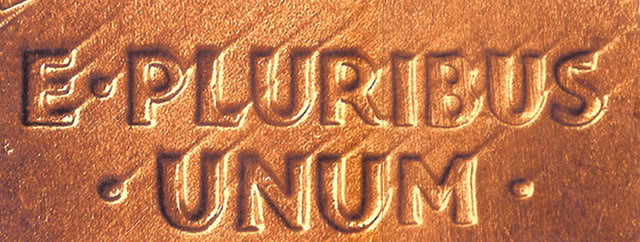
1994 Lincoln cent with trails coming off of E PLURIBUS UNUM.

The wavy step or trails error is a die error that is found on some United States minted coins beginning in 1986. The anomaly occurs during the die making by the single-squeeze hubbing process.

== Cause ==
While the exact cause of "trails/wavy steps" is not known, it is believed to be caused by movement of the die against the hub during the single squeeze hubbing process. Similarities exist between this anomaly and the doubled die, however, the major difference is that a doubled die is a duplication of a design element, while a "trail" die is an extension of a design element.

== Single-squeeze hubbing ==
In 1986 The Annual Report of the Director of the Mint for financial year 1986, states that the mint had been experimenting with a new single-squeeze hubbing system. In the year 1996, the mint announced at the opening of the Denver Mint's die shop that the cent, nickel, and dime dies would be made from this process. It took until 1999 to include the rest of the denominational coins' dies to be produced by this method.

While the purpose of the single-squeeze hubbing process's creation was to entirely eliminate the doubled die error, not only has it failed to do so, but also it has produced this die anomaly whose properties are similar in nature. This anomaly, known as "wavy steps" or "trails", is considered a variety type error since it is found on every coin that the particular affected die produces.

== Statistics ==
The die anomaly, "trails", began to occur in the year 1986, shortly after the mint began experimenting with the single-squeeze hubbing process and persists even up to 2011. Up to 2011, over 1,200 examples of dies affected with this anomaly have been found on cents, nickels, dimes, quarters, and dollars.

The first wavy step die was discovered in 1995 on a 1994 Lincoln cent from the Philadelphia mint. It was not until 2003 that this die variety gained popularity when another die, a 2003 Lincoln cent, was discovered and written about in Coin World magazine. It was only a matter of time that more and more of these varieties began to be uncovered. It wasn't until the year 2003 that the name "wavy steps" was affixed to this anomaly.

The phrase "trail" die was first thought of in the year 2000, when Ken Potter observed lines trailing off some of the design elements of a wavy step die. Comparison of other dies that carried both "wavy steps" and "trails" showed that the lines from both anomalies traveled in the same exact direction. From this, it was ascertained that these anomalies were one and the same thing with the only difference being the direction that the lines took.

== See also ==
- Mint-made errors
- US error coins
