= Mint-made errors =

Coins with errors while minting

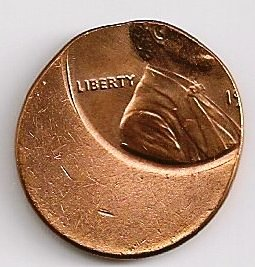
US Lincoln cent struck off-center

Mint-made errors occur when coins are made incorrectly at the mint, including anything that happens to the coin up until the completion of the minting process. Mint error coins can be the result of deterioration of the minting equipment, accidents or malfunctions during the minting process, or interventions by mint personnel. Coins are inspected during production and errors are typically caught. However, some are inadvertently released into circulation. Modern production methods eliminate many errors, and automated counters are effective at removing error coins. Damage occurring later (post-mint damage (PMD)) may sometimes resemble true mint errors. Error coins may be of value to collectors, depending on the rarity and condition. Some coin collectors specialize in error coins.

Errors can be the result of defective planchets, defective dies or the result of mistakes made during striking. The planchet, die, and striking (or PDS) classification system happens to correspond with the mintmarks of the three largest U.S. mints, Philadelphia, Denver, and San Francisco. Some errors have multiple causes, and not all errors fall neatly within the categories. For example, design elements may be missing from coins because die crevices were filled with grease – a problem with the die, but the error occurs when the coin is struck. Labels used to identify specific categories of errors may describe the cause of the error (die crack, rotated die, clipped planchet), the appearance of the coin (wavy steps, trails, missing element) or other factors (mule, cud, brockage). Some errors are known by multiple names, e.g., filled die errors are also known as missing design element errors and as strike-throughs.

Some errors, such as an off-center strike, are unique. Other errors, such as those resulting from a specific die crack, form a variety, i.e., a group of coins with distinctive details or characteristics. Uniqueness does not necessarily make an error coin valuable. Although no other coin may be the same as a coin with a particular off-center strike, off-center strikes of varying degrees are not extremely rare. Accidental error coins are perhaps the most numerous, although in modern minting they are rare, making them potentially valuable to collectors. Intentional intervention by mint personnel does not typically involve a deliberate attempt to create an error, but usually involves an action intended to improve quality that miscarries.

== Planchet preparation errors ==
Mints purchase long strips of metal which are fed through blanking machines that punch out disks known as blank planchets (or simply as planchets or blanks) on which coins are struck. This determines the size and shape of eventual coins.

=== Blank planchet ===
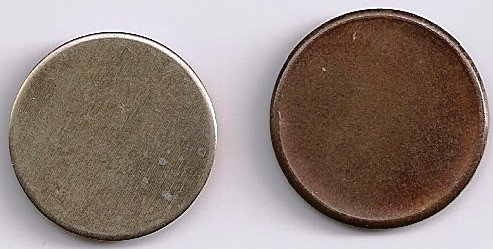
U.S. dime Type 1 blank (left) and one cent Type 2 blank (right)

The punched disks are first known as "Type-1" blanks (or planchets). After an upending mill adds uniform rounded rims, the disks are called "Type-2" blanks (or planchets). Occasionally, Type-1 and Type-2 blanks aren't further processed but ‘escape’ the mint facility and enter circulation. Type-2 blanks may also be considered striking errors as they are prepared correctly, but are released without having been struck.

=== Clipped planchet ===
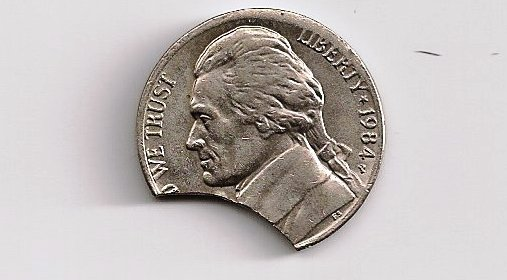
Clipped planchet U.S. nickel showing the Blakesley Effect near the word LIBERTY

A misfeed can occur when the metal strip is fed through the blanking machine. The punches sometimes overlap the leading edge of the metal, producing a straight clip. Sometimes, the punches strike an area of the strip which overlaps the hole left by the previous strike, producing a curved clip. On such curved-clip coins, often the rim opposite the clip shows a distinctive distortion and loss of detail called the Blakesley Effect. Sometimes, punches strike the irregular trailing edge of the metal strip, producing irregular clips.

=== Improper planchet thickness ===
Coins are sometimes struck on planchets that are either too thin or too thick, producing underweight or overweight coins. This error can be due to incorrect equipment settings that cause the metal strip to be rolled to the wrong thickness or due to the use of a metal strip intended for another coin denomination, such as a U.S. quarter planchet cut from a metal roll intended for dimes.

=== Lamination flaw ===
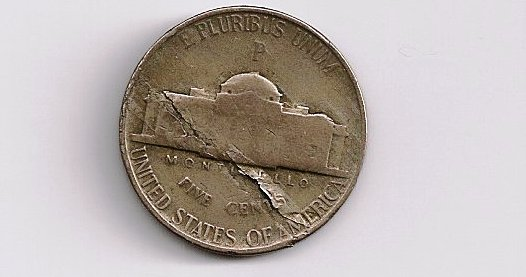
Lamination crack on a U.S. Jefferson nickel

A lamination flaw is a planchet defect that results from metal impurities or internal stresses. Lamination flaws cause discoloration, uneven surfaces, peeling, and splitting.

=== Split planchet ===
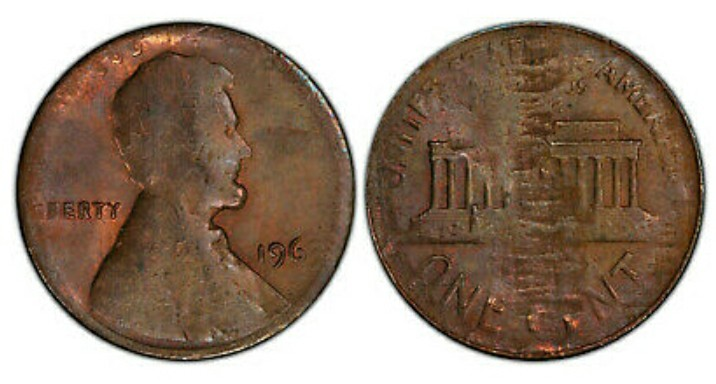
A 1963 U.S. Lincoln Cent with split before strike planchet error. Note the weakly struck obverse (left) and striations on the reverse (right).

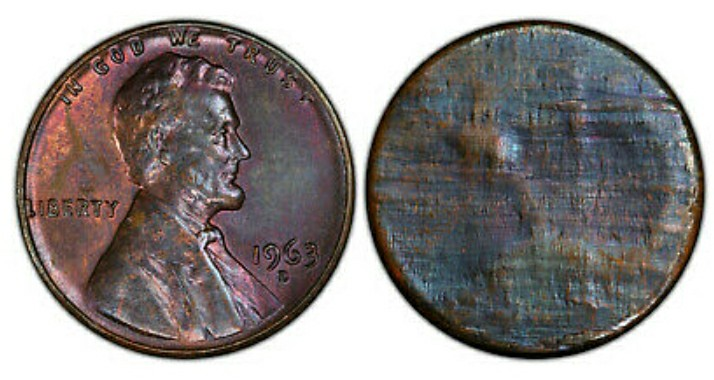
A 1963-D U.S. Lincoln Cent with split after strike planchet error. Note the normal strike on the obverse (left) and lack of design on the reverse (right).

A split planchet coin error occurs when, during the preparation of the planchet strip, impurities such as gas, dirt, or grease become trapped under the surface of the metal blank, creating a weakness or lamination defect. This weak area of the metal may flake, peel, or split because the adhesion is poor.

Split planchet errors are normally restricted to planchets composed of a solid alloy, such as U.S. cents and nickels, and the Australian fifty-cent coin. Split planchet errors should not be confused with "separation errors", which only affect clad and plated coins. Separation errors are bonding errors, not alloy errors.

A split can occur either before or after the coin is struck. The descriptive terms split before strike and split after strike are used to distinguish the respective types. A "split before strike" will show design on both sides of the coin, have coarse to fine striations, and will usually be weakly struck. A "split after strike" will show a normal strike on one side, but will have a rough, design-free surface on the other side and will always weigh less than a normal planchet.

=== Cladding flaw ===
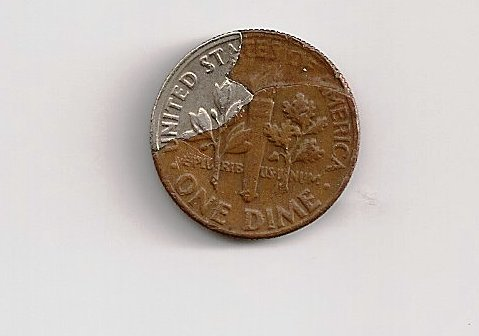
Peeled cladding on a U.S. Roosevelt dime

Many modern coins are made of layers of different metals known as clads. These cladding layers sometimes peel, fold, or completely separate.

== Hub and die errors ==
Mints use hubs bearing raised images similar to the images that appear on a coin to imprint indented images onto the ends of steel rods. Those rods become the dies which strike planchets, making them into coins. Hub and die errors can occur when the dies are made, when the dies are installed into presses, and as dies deteriorate during use. Modern coins can still be released with hub and die errors when the defects are too small to be seen with the naked eye. Sometimes, dies are used despite producing obvious flaws, such as the 1955 U.S. Lincoln cent.

=== Fundamental die-setting error ===
A fundamental die-setting error occurs when the die is not set as the producers intended. For example, in April 2013 the Central Bank of Ireland issued a silver €10 commemorative coin in honor of James Joyce that misquoted a famous line from his masterwork Ulysses despite being warned on at least two occasions by the Department of Finance over difficulties with copyright and design.

=== Missing design elements ===
Partial date on U.S. cent likely caused by filled die

Missing mintmarks, dates, and other design elements occur as the result of errors in the die or at the time of striking. A design element that is missing from the die when it is made is a fundamental error. Missing design elements that occur because dies are tilted and do not strike the planchet face-on are known as misaligned dies. A design element may be missing because foreign matter, such as grease, plugs the cavity into which the planchet's metal would normally flow under the striking pressure. This error is also known as a filled die or a strike-through. Although this does involve a die, it is typically thought of as a striking error, but is included here for completeness. This type of error led to some specimens of the 1999 release of the U.S. 50 State quarters design for Delaware to be missing the final E from the state's motto, thus accidentally declaring Delaware "THE FIRST STAT."

=== Doubled die ===
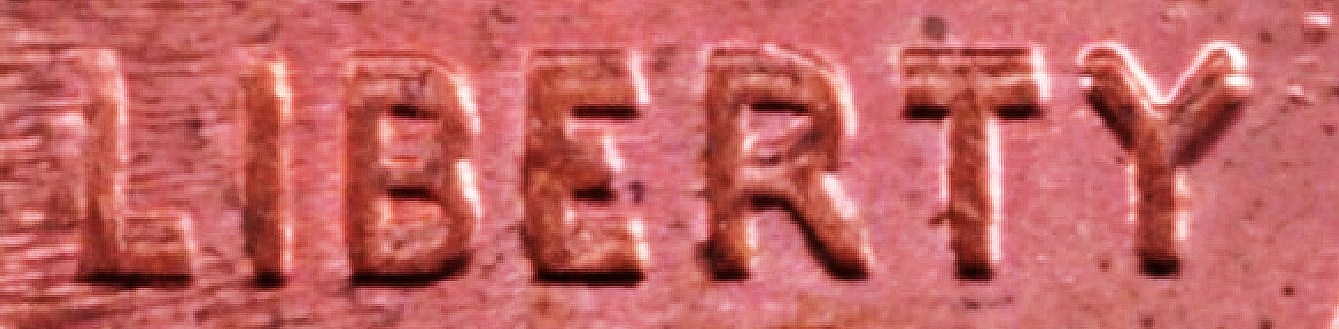
Doubling on LIBERTY from the 1995 doubled die U.S. Lincoln cent

A doubled die occurs when a die receives an additional, misaligned impression from the hub. Overdate coins such as the 1942/1 U.S. Mercury dime and 1918/7 U.S. Buffalo nickel are also doubled dies. They are both listed by CONECA as Class III doubled dies. Class III means the die was hubbed with different "designs" (or hubs that had different dates). They are not repunched dates, since the dates were punched onto the hub. Die deterioration may also appear as doubling.

=== Die defects: cracks, breaks, and chips ===
A die crack is seen to the left of Lincoln's head

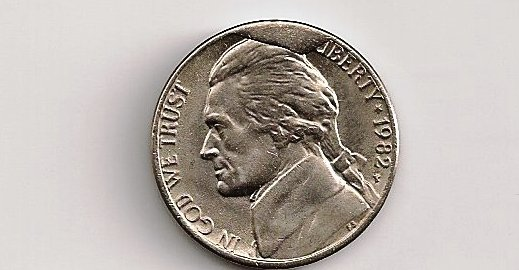
Broken die resulting in a "cud" atop Jefferson's head

Dies can crack during use, producing jagged, raised lines on the surface of subsequently struck coins. In U.S. coinage, many Morgan dollar coins show slight die cracks. Dies with cracks, especially those with cracks near the edge, sometimes break. The broken piece may be retained in position or fall away. Die cracks and retained die breaks can be difficult to distinguish. Retained die breaks cross the coin's face from rim to rim, with the area to one side of the break being slightly higher than the other. Coins struck after the break falls away have a raised, rounded, unstruck area along the edge. These coins are known to collectors as cuds. Sometimes, an area of a die will chip out of the center. These so-called die chips also appear as raised, rounded, unstruck areas on subsequently struck coins.

=== Die clash ===
The marks seen above the word LIBERTY on this U.S. cent were caused by the obverse die clashing with elements on the reverse die intended to impress the space between the memorial columns in the design

A die clash occurs when the obverse and reverse dies are damaged upon striking each other without a planchet between them. Due to the tremendous pressure used, parts of the image of one die may be impressed on the other. Planchets subsequently struck by the clashed dies receive the distorted image. A well-known example is the "Bugs Bunny" Franklin half dollar of 1955, where part of the eagle's wing from the reverse gives Franklin the appearance of protruding teeth.

=== MAD clash ===
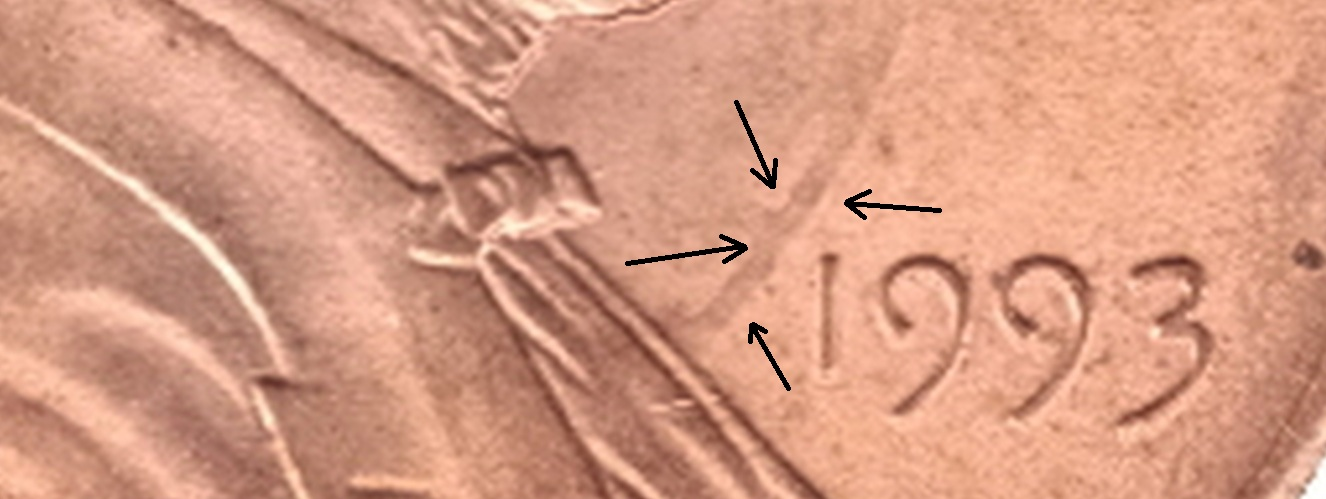
1993 MAD clash mark on a U.S. cent

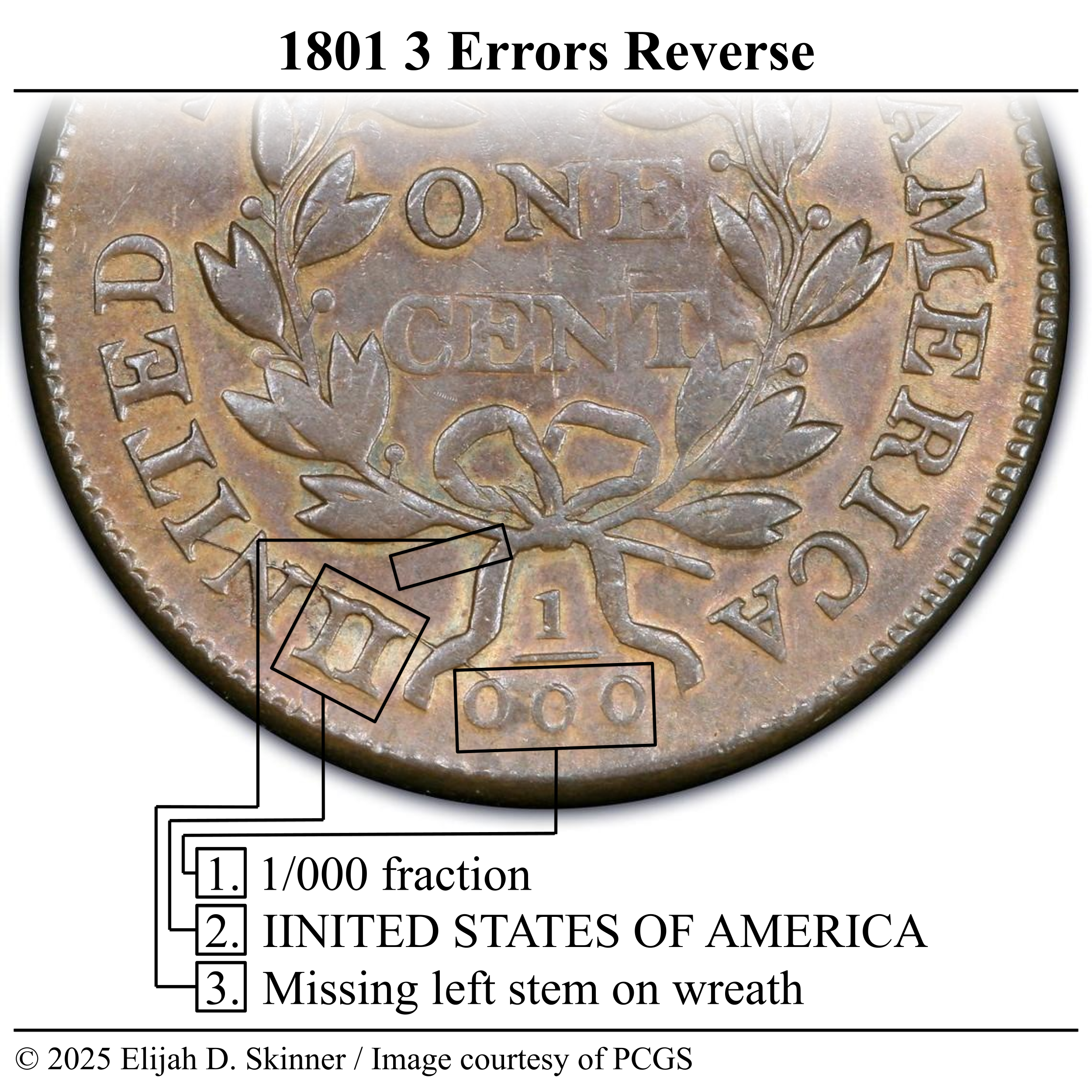
The 1801 3 errors reverse large cent is an example of a die setting error.

A MAD clash (short for "misaligned dies") occurs when an obverse and reverse die strike each other while misaligned in relation to each other. Additional misalignment errors are discussed below.

=== Die setting errors ===
Double-punched mintmark

Historically, some design elements near the outer perimeter of a die were added by individual iron punches because technology made it difficult to press both the central and perimeter design elements at the same time. Also, some dies were made without mintmarks or dates to permit their use at different mints. A die technician added missing elements by positioning a puncheon, a small steel rod with the mirror image of a letter or number on it, and striking the puncheon with a hammer, pressing the image into the die. If the image is not strong enough, the technician will punch it a second time. Puncheons placed in a different position between strikes will produce a doubled image which is called a repunch. Dual punches occur when punching is repeated in a second location. Sometimes, technicians use a puncheon with the wrong or incorrectly sized letter or number. A well-known example of a small mintmark is the 1945-S "Micro S" U.S. Mercury dime, when the mint used an old puncheon intended for Philippine coins. A much rarer example is the 1892-O "Micro O" U.S. Barber half dollar, which may have come about from the brief use of a mintmark puncheon intended for the quarter. The same error occurred with the 1905-O U.S. Barber dime. Numerous examples are known of this mistake. Modern techniques have eliminated the need to add design elements by punching as they are an integral part of the design and included in each step of the hub and die making processes.

=== Overdates and overmintmarks ===
In the past, mints used dies until they broke. At the beginning of the year, mints punched a new date over the old on dies that were in use. For 19th-century coins, it is difficult to call an overdate an "error", as it resulted from intentional recycling of the die. An overmintmark occurs when a second mintmark is punched over an earlier mintmark following the transfer of a die from one mint to another. A well-known example is the 1900 Morgan silver dollar, when reverse dies with "CC" below the eagle were sent from the Carson City Mint to the New Orleans Mint, where they were given an "O". A similar case occurred in 1938, when a reverse die for the buffalo nickel was made for the San Francisco Mint, because that year, only the Denver Mint made these coins with a "D" punched over the "S".

=== Trails ===
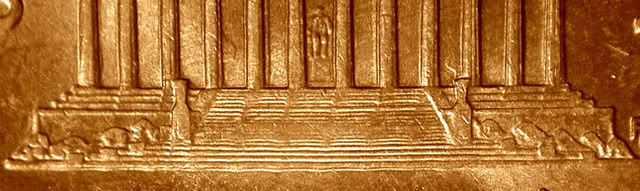
1999 U.S. Lincoln cent depicting wavy steps.

Lines, called trails, transfer to coins from dies made using the modern high-pressure "single pressing" process. When images are impressed into dies using the process, the displaced metal moves out into fields, leaving visible lines on the dies. The dies themselves are called trail dies. Coins on which the lines appear are simply called trails. Trails were first noted on Lincoln Memorial steps found on the reverse of one-cent coins minted from 1959 to 2008. The trails gave the steps the appearance of being wavy. The term wavy steps is still used to refer to trails found on the memorial steps, but the term trails is more commonly used to refer to lines found elsewhere.

=== Mule ===
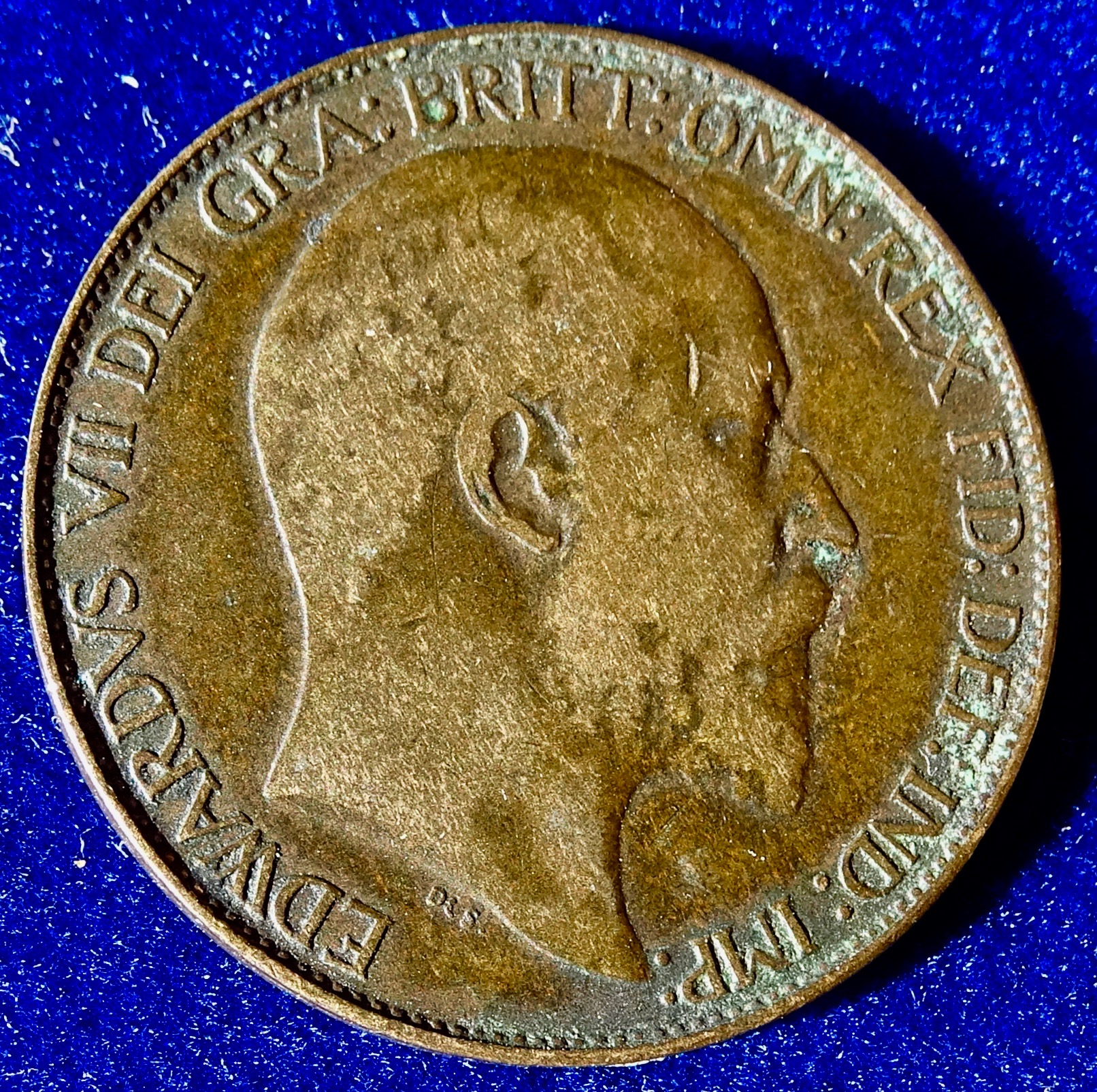
Obverse face showing the profile of King Edward VII.

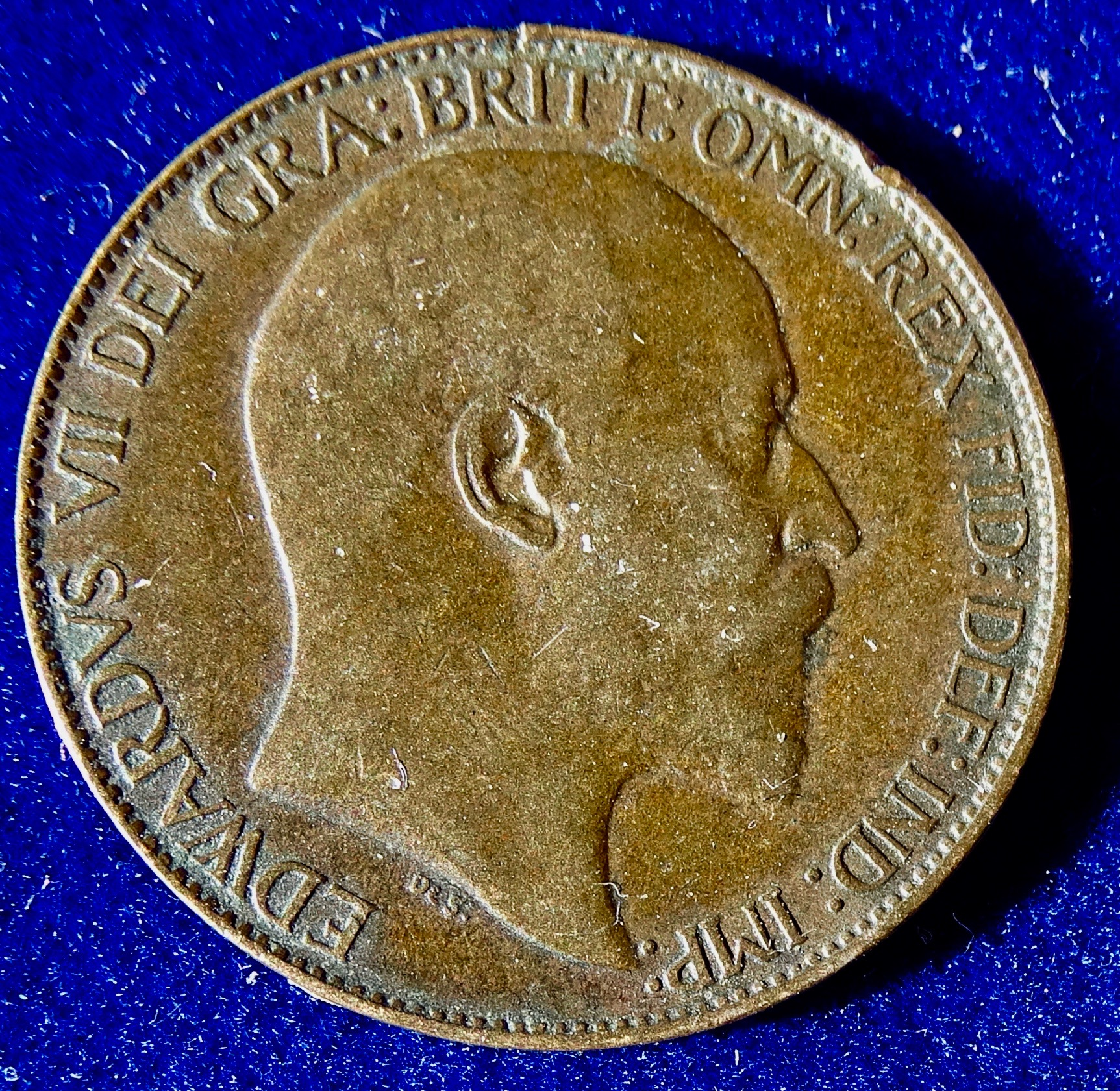
The reverse of that same coin, also minted with an obverse die.

Great Britain dateless double obverse "mule" halfpenny Edward VII (1902 to 1910). What looks like a mint error is actually a cleverly made-up double-headed coin using two different coins. Found in Australia, where it was legal tender, this manipulated coin could have been used fraudulently in the popular Two-up game.

A coin struck using dies never intended for use together is called a "mule". An example is a coin struck with dies designed for different coin denominations, or a coin struck with two dies that both lack a minting year on them, resulting in a "dateless" coin.

=== Misaligned dies ===
Because of misalignment, the obverse of this coin is off-center but the reverse is centered

Dies must be properly aligned in presses for coins to be struck correctly. Errors occur when dies are offset, tilted, or rotated. Offset errors occur when the hammer die is not centered over the anvil die, typically resulting in an off-center obverse but centered reverse. Tilting errors occur when die surfaces are not parallel, producing coins that are thinner along one edge and sometimes causing missing design elements along the opposite edge because of insufficient pressure being exerted on that edge. Rotation errors occur when the images on the obverse and reverse dies are turned from the normal positions, such as when the reverse image is at a right angle to the obverse.

== Strike errors ==
Strike errors occur when the planchet is struck. It is a fault in the manufacturing process rather than in either the die or the planchet. Numismatists often prize strike-error coins over perfectly struck examples, which tend to be more common, but less highly than die-error coins, which are usually rarer, making them valuable.

=== Broadstrike ===
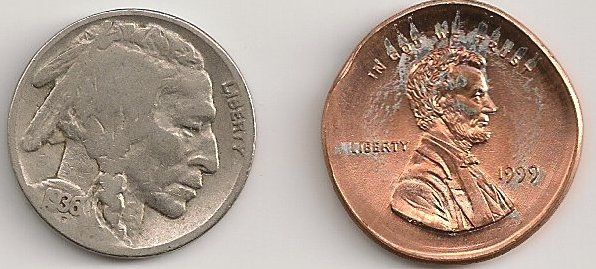
This broad-struck U.S. Lincoln cent is the size of a nickel

Broadstrike errors are produced when the collar die (the circular die surrounding the lower die) malfunctions. The collar prevents the metal of the blank from flowing outside the confines of the die. All denominations of U.S. coins with a broadstrike have plain edges.

=== Strike-through ===
A "strike-through" coin is made when another object comes between a blank and a die at the time of striking. That object's outline is pressed into the blank's surface. Common examples include hard objects such as staples, metal shavings, and other coins as well as soft objects such as cloth and grease. Hard objects leave sharp outlines and, on occasion, adhere to the blank, producing a coin called a "retained strike-through". A planchet "struck through a coin" is left with an impression of the coin called brockage (discussed below). When the "strike-through" object is a blank planchet, the result is a uni-face coin with one struck side and one blank side (see below). When the "struck-through" object is another coin, and that coin adheres to a die (as opposed to the other coin), the adhered coin is called a "die cap" (discussed below). Two coins which adhere to one another are called "bonded pairs". Softer objects, such as grease, can fill crevices in a die, producing a weak strike with a smudged appearance. These errors are often called "missing element coins" (discussed above and as "filled dies"). (A great example of such an error occurred in 1922, when only the Denver Mint struck Lincoln cents. As a result of the mint attempting to speed up production, such a large amount of excessive grease was applied to the dies that the mintmark was obscured and therefore either nonexistent or weakened on the 1922 cents. These are very popular with collectors.)

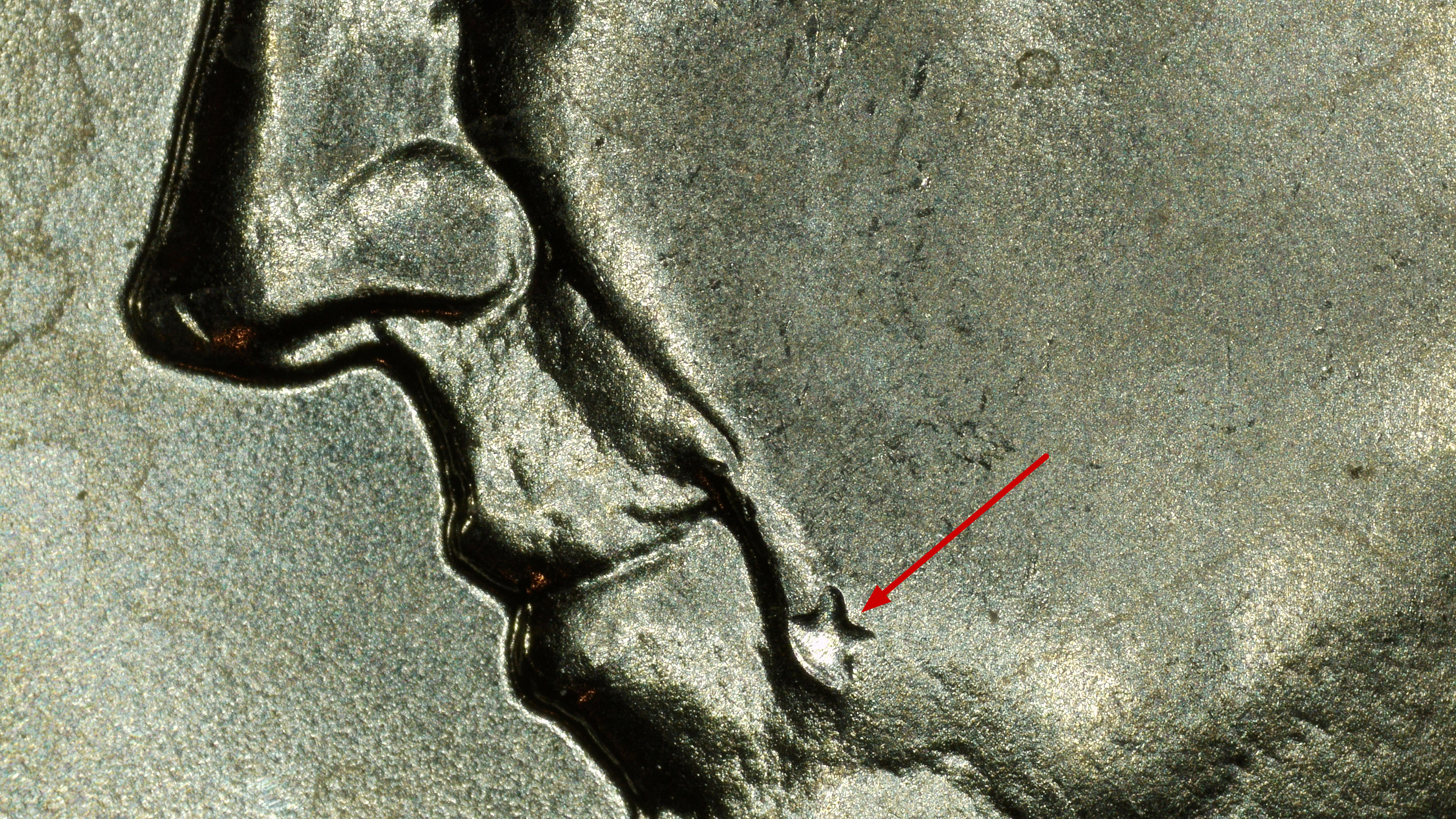
Dropped Star on a Kennedy Half Dollar

A distinct but related type of error occurs when compacted die fill (“grease”) falls out of a recess in the die face and onto a planchet before the strike. This fallen plug of hardened material then acts as the intervening object in a strike-through, creating what is known as a "dropped element" error. The plug is struck into the planchet, leaving an incuse (sunken) impression of the die element (like a letter or number) it had formed around. Letters (“dropped letters”) and numbers (“dropped numbers”) are the most frequently seen dropped elements. The orientation of the resulting incuse impression depends on how the plug lands: if it doesn't flip and remains near its original die, the impression is normally oriented; if it flips over or lands against the opposite die, the impression is a mirror image. Normally oriented dropped elements are more common.

Uni-face coin (blank reverse)

=== Uni-face coin ===
A uni-face coin results when two planchets are stacked one atop the other at the time of striking. This produces two coins: one with only an obverse image, and a second with only the reverse image. The planchets may be centered over the die, producing one complete image on each coin, or off-center, producing partial images on each side. In the accompanying image of the blank reverse, the shadow or outline of Lincoln's profile from the obverse side of the coin is visible.

=== Die cap ===
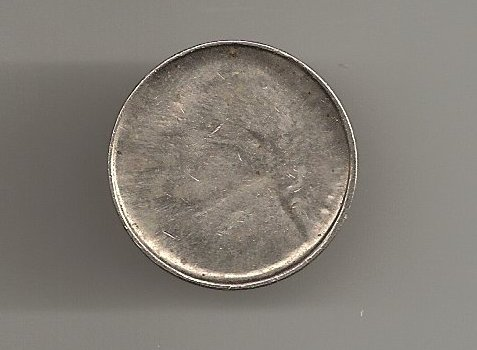
Die cap

A struck coin remains on a die and leaves its slowly fading impression (called brockage) on subsequently struck coins. Subsequent strikes cause the stuck coin to gradually change shape if it isn't dislodged, eventually resulting in it taking on a dome-like shape akin to a bottle cap.

=== Brockage ===
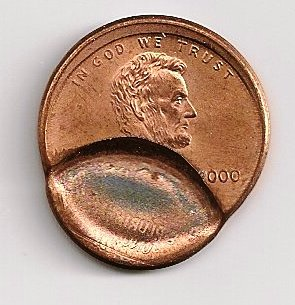
The brockage image of the Lincoln Memorial can be seen near the bottom of the coin

Brockage occurs when a mirror image of a coin is struck on a blank. After a struck coin fails to eject, a new blank is fed between the struck coin and the hammer die. The hammer die strikes the second blank, leaving its image on one side while pressing the blank against the previously stuck coin, which sinks its image into the opposite side. Most brockages are off-center, but fully overlapping brockages are the most desirable.

=== Edge strike ===
There are two types of edge strikes. A standing edge strike occurs when a blank "bounces" so that it is standing on edge as it is struck. Striking pressure produces edge indentations where the dies strike and sometimes bends the blank. Repeated strikes can produce a coin that is folded flat. Chain edge strikes occur when two blanks are fed into the space between dies at the same time. The blanks expand when struck and press together, leaving each with a single indented edge. Two chain-edge-struck coins together are known as a matched pair.

=== Multiple strike ===
Lincoln cent with second off-center strike

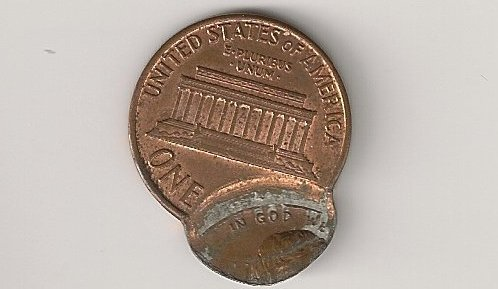
Flip-over multi-struck coin

A multiple strike, also referred to as a double exposure, occurs when the coin has additional images from being struck again, off center. The result is sometimes mistaken for a "doubled die". On occasion, a coin will flip over between strikes so that the second image is that of the opposite side of the coin.

=== Off-center strike ===
An off-center coin is produced when the coin is struck once, albeit off center. Unlike that in a broadstrike, the punch is not in the center of the coin but rather at the edge. This results in a coin which is not circular. The coin gives a freakish appearance as a result, and various amounts of blank planchet space are visible. The coins can vary in value because of how far off center they are struck, although coins with full dates are more desirable than coins without a date or with missing digits.

=== Double denomination ===
A double-denomination coin is one that has been struck twice between dies of different denominations, such as once between nickel dies and again between quarter dies. The term is sometimes used to refer to a coin struck on the wrong planchet (see below).

=== Struck on wrong planchet ===
Nickel struck on one cent planchet

Sometimes, planchets for one coin denomination are fed into a coin-stamping press equipped with dies of another denomination. This results in a coin that has been stamped with a design intended for a differently sized coin. The resulting errors are prized by collectors, though they are usually caught during the manufacturing process and destroyed. Such errors are sometimes called "double denomination" coins, but that term is also used to refer to coins struck a second time with dies of a different denomination.

Some examples include cents struck on dime planchets, nickels on cent planchets, or quarters on dime planchets. This type of error should not be confused with the much rarer mule, which is a coin struck between dies that were never intended to be used together, such as a coin with a nickel obverse and a dime reverse.

Wrong-planchet errors may also occur when the composition of the coin changes. Such situations generally arise when the mint has decided to change the alloy or plating of the coin in the new coinage year, but a few planchets from the previous year—and thus of the previous composition—have yet to be struck. Should the dies be changed for the new year while the old planchets are awaiting striking and are not removed, coins using the old composition will be struck with the new year's date. Such coins are rare and often highly valued by collectors, as with the 1943 copper cents and 1944 steel cents. In 2026, several silver Britannia bullion coins were struck by the Royal Mint on cupronickel blanks.

A much rarer error is a denomination struck on a foreign planchet. This did occur occasionally with United States (and before that American colonial) coinage in the 17th, 18th, and 19th centuries. In the 20th century, fewer errors on foreign planchets were discovered, but they still occur when the U.S. Mint is contracted by foreign governments to produce coinage for them, and can have a high value. Recent encapsulations and sales at auctions reveal 1995 and 1996 examples of coins struck on foreign planchets. A few 1996 Lincoln cents were struck on stock designated for Singapore. Lincoln cents dated 1997-D, 1998, and 2000 were struck on foreign planchets, but PCGS and NGC have not identified the country for which the stock was intended. A wrong-planchet error that sold for $5,462.50 on Heritage Auctions in August 2010 is an undated U.S. nickel struck on top of a 1960 Peruvian 5 centavos.

=== Edge and rim errors ===
Blanks are surrounded by collars when struck to prevent the blank from flattening and spreading. Edge and rim errors occur when collars are either out of position or deteriorated. A wire rim occurs when excessive pressure squeezes out metal between the collar and the edge of the die, producing an extremely high, thin rim. A partial collar occurs when an out-of-position collar leaves a line around the coin which is visible edge-on. A partial collar is sometimes called a railroad rim when a reeded edge coin is involved, as the line resembles a rail and the reeds resemble railroad ties.

=== Mated pair or set ===
In a collection of two or more coins struck at the same time or during successive strikes on one or more dies, the coins with the resulting errors are related to one another, fitting together as a set. All brockages, indents, chain edge strikes, and capped die strikes have a corresponding coin, but are rarely found together. A single coin of the set may be discovered by mint staff during quality control and removed, or the coins may be separated into different lots to be distributed separately into circulation.

== Post-mint damage ==
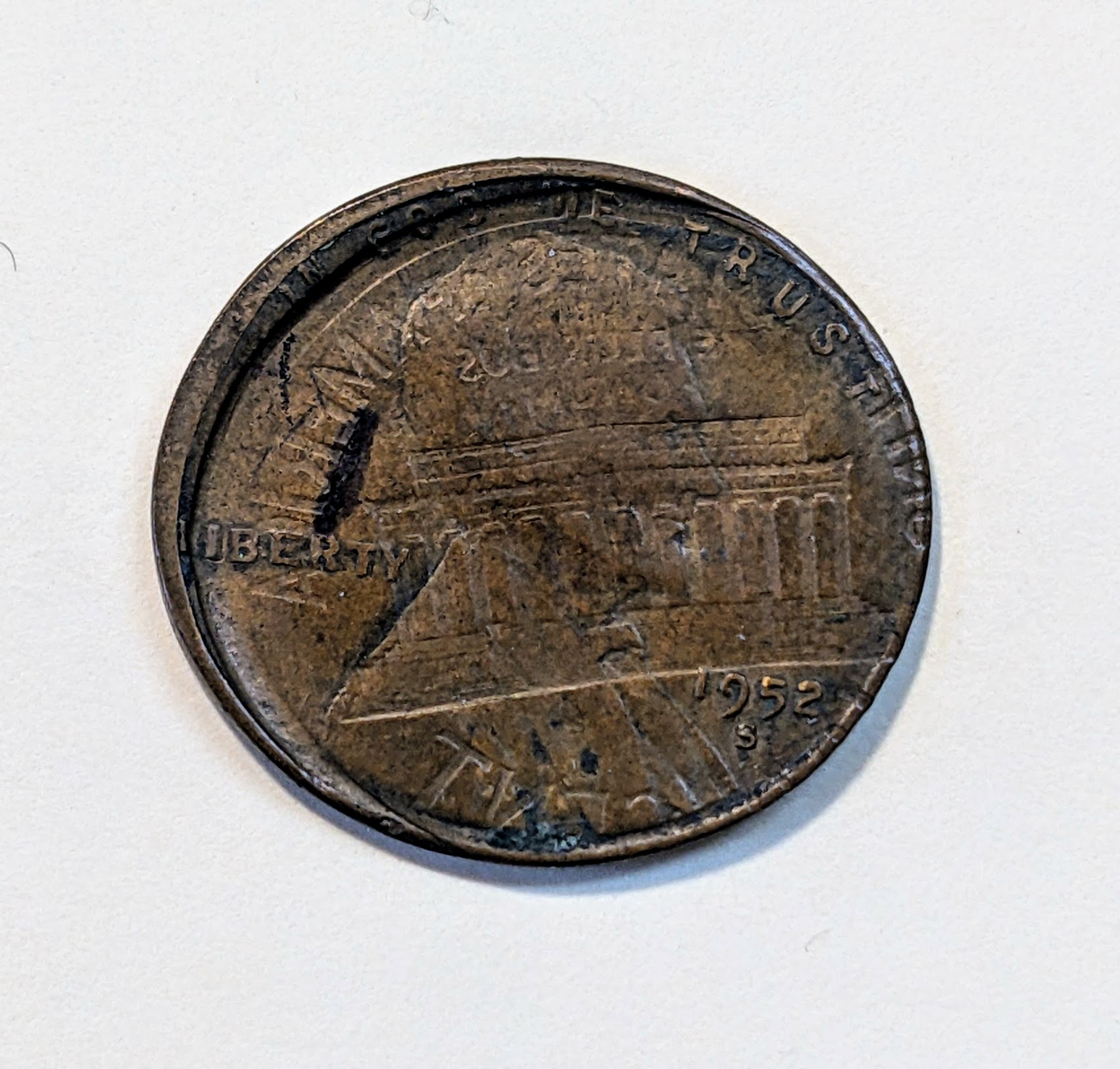
U.S. Lincoln cent (obverse) with an impression of a Lincoln reverse due to post-mint compression damage from a train

Authentic error coins are often confused with coins that have post-mint damage (PMD). Such coins are damaged (gouged, scraped, etched, mutilated, flattened) after the final strike, either accidentally or deliberately. If damage occurs at the mint after the minting process, for example, in subsequent automated handling, it is still considered post-mint damage. Corrosion, scratches, bending, and dings can all affect coins in circulation and sometimes may mimic mint errors.

== Numismatic value of error coins ==
Like other coins, the value of errors is based in part on rarity and condition. In general, lower-denomination errors are less expensive than higher-denomination errors simply because more such coins are minted, resulting in available errors. Due to improvements in production and inspection, modern errors are rarer, and this impacts value. Some types of errors, such as clipped planchets, edge strikes, and foreign-object strike-throughs, can be faked. Many errors are sold ungraded because of their relatively low value and the relative cost of grading. In addition, errors are often not noted by grading services. Overdates, mules, brockages, double-denomination errors, and wrong-planchet errors are often valuable. Errors on ancient, medieval, and higher-value coins, however, may be detrimental to the coin's numismatic value.

== Notable Australian coin varieties and errors ==
- 1966 "Wavy 2" 20 cents
- 1979 "Double Bar" 50 cents
- 1980 "Double Bar" 50 cents
- 1981 "3-1/2 claw" 20 cents
- 1994 "Wide Date" 50 cents
- 2000 "Incused Flag" Millennium 50 cents
- 2000 $1/10-cent mule
- 2001 rotated-die Centenary of Federation $1
- 2004 "Pointy A" Large Head 20 cents

== Notable U.S. coin varieties and errors ==
- 1918/7 Buffalo nickel
- 1918/7-S Standing Liberty quarter
- 1922 "No D" Lincoln cent
- 1937-D 3-legged Buffalo nickel
- 1942/1 Mercury dime
- 1942/1-D Mercury dime
- 1943 copper cent
- 1944 steel cent
- 1955 doubled die obverse cent
- 1958 handsome mule Franklin half dollar
- 1969-S doubled die obverse cent
- 1970-S doubled die obverse cent with a small or large date
- 1972 doubled die obverse cent
- 1974 aluminum cent
- 1975 "No S" Proof Roosevelt dime
- 1982 No P dime
- 1982-D Small Date Bronze Lincoln cent
- 1983 copper Lincoln cent
- 1983 doubled die reverse cent
- 1984 doubled ear cent
- 1990 "No S" Proof Lincoln cent
- 1992 & 1992-D "Close AM" Lincoln cents
- 1995 doubled die obverse cent
- 2000 Sacagawea dollar – Washington quarter mule
- 2004-D Wisconsin extra leaf quarters
- 2007 Presidential dollars missing edge lettering

== Notable British coin errors ==
- 1983 "New Pence" Two pence
- 2005 "Pemember" Two pounds
- 2008 Dateless Twenty pence mule, using the obverse of the 1982–2008 design and the reverse of the 2008–present design, both of which lack dates.
- 2011 "Aquatics" Fifty pence
- Silver 2 pence, a two pence coin accidentally struck on a cupronickel planchet typically used for ten pence coins

== Notable Philippine coin errors ==
- 1983 "Pithecobhaga" fifty centavos
- 1983 "Pygmea" ten centavos

== See also ==
- Coin collecting
- Coining (mint)
- Die defect
- Die-deterioration doubling
- Doubled die
- Wavy step
- Star notes, banknotes of the U.S. dollar printed to replace misprinted notes in the production process
- US error coins
