= Silver 2 pence =

Type of British error coin

Error Silver Two Pence
- UK
- Value: £0.02 (face value)
- Mass: 7.12 g
- Diameter: 25.9 mm
- Shape: Circle
- Composition: Cupro-nickel or Nickel-plated steel used in 10 pence

Obverse
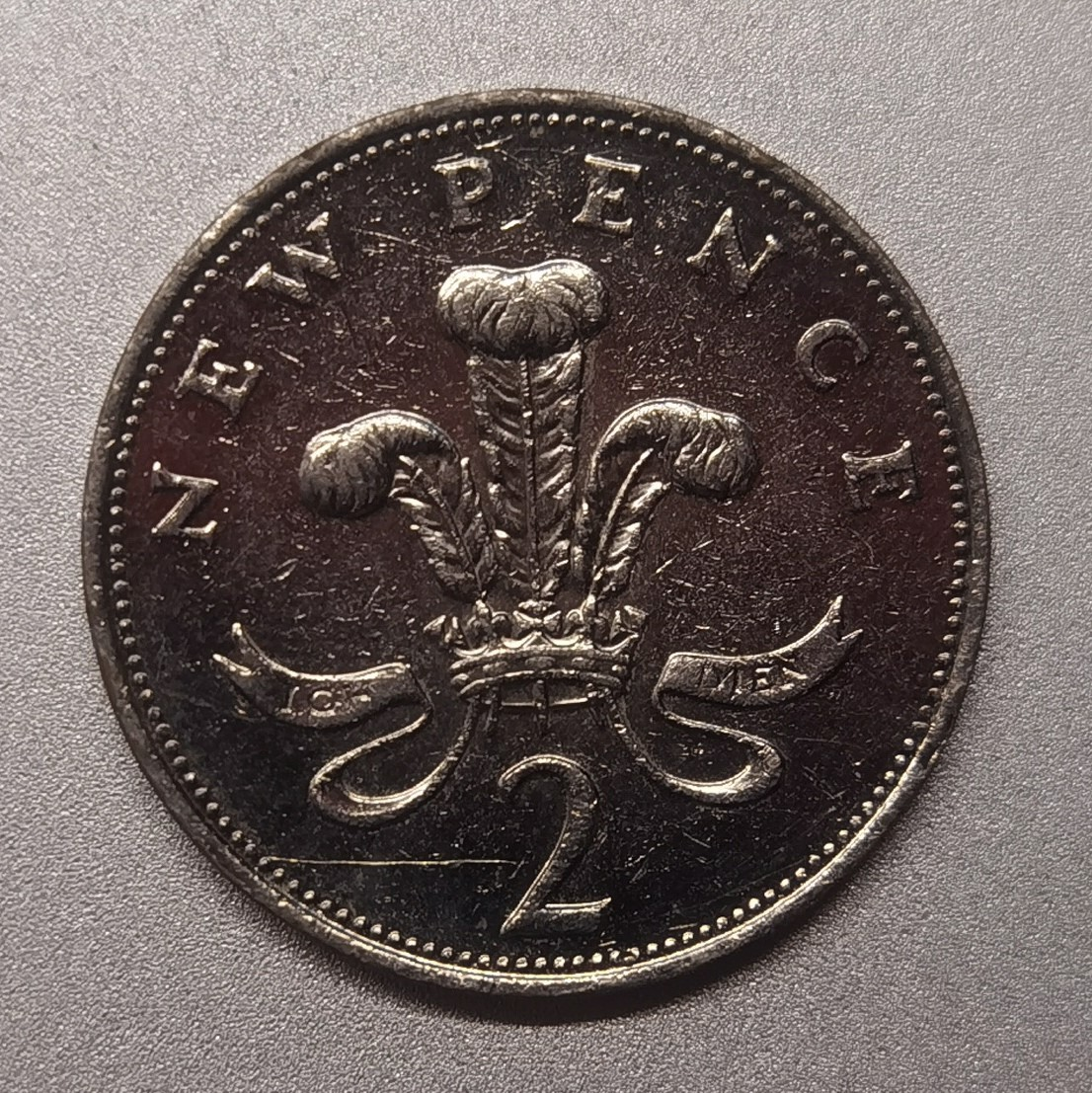

Reverse
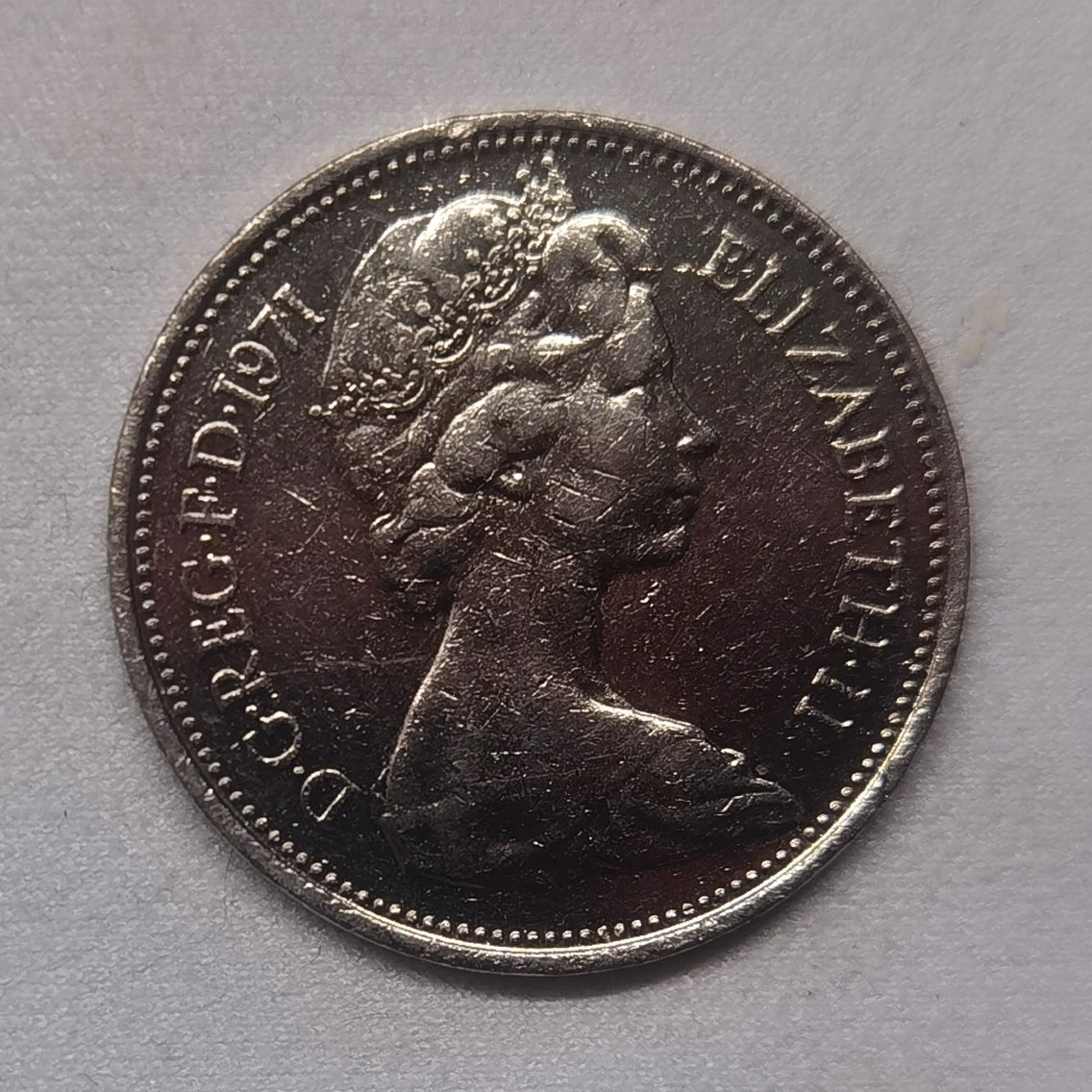

Silver two pences are British error coins that occur when silver-coloured two pence British coins are accidentally struck after a cupro-nickel blank, which is used for ten pence coins, was left inside the barrel during the minting process.

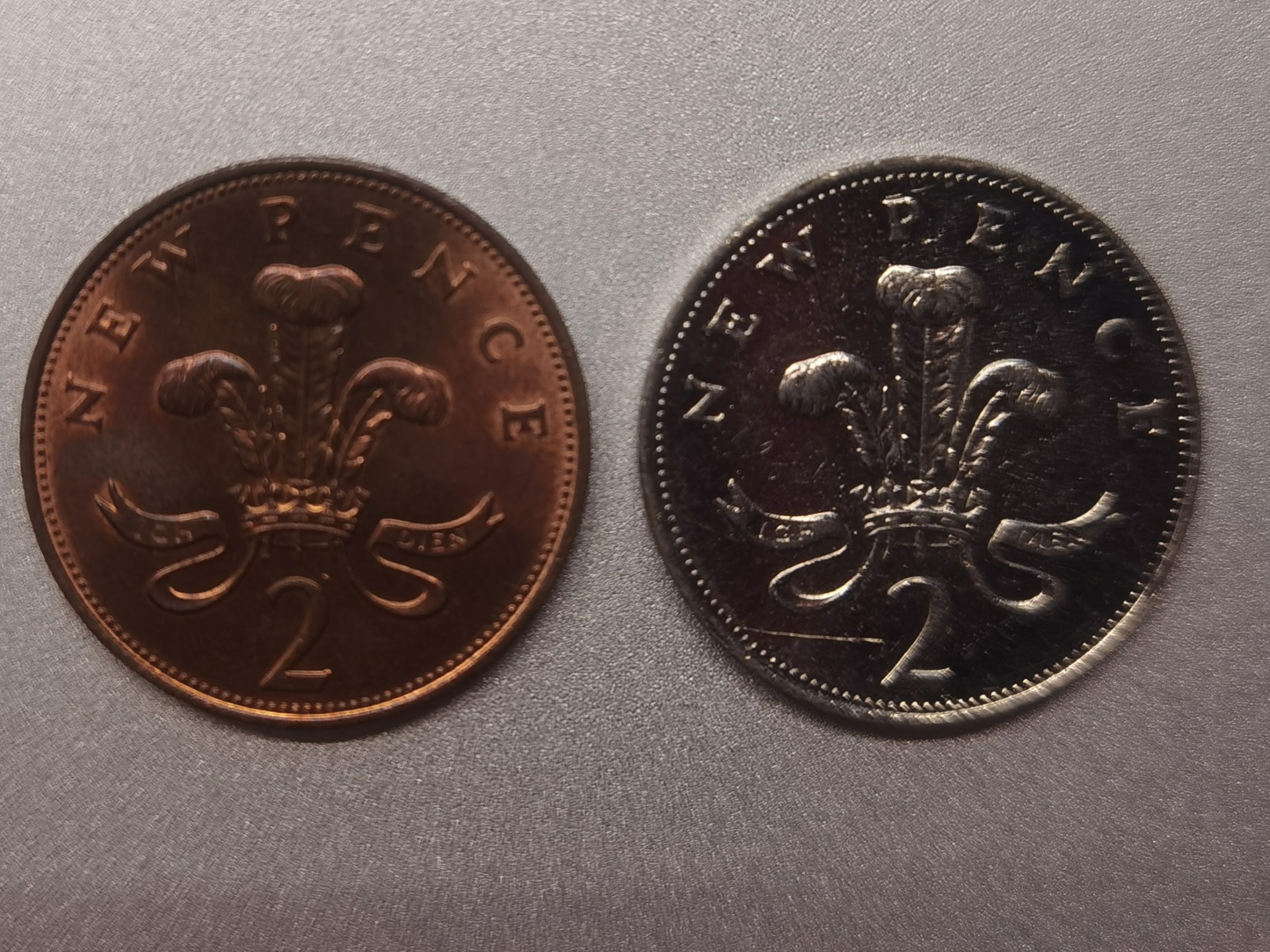
Comparison between normal two pence coin (left) and error coin

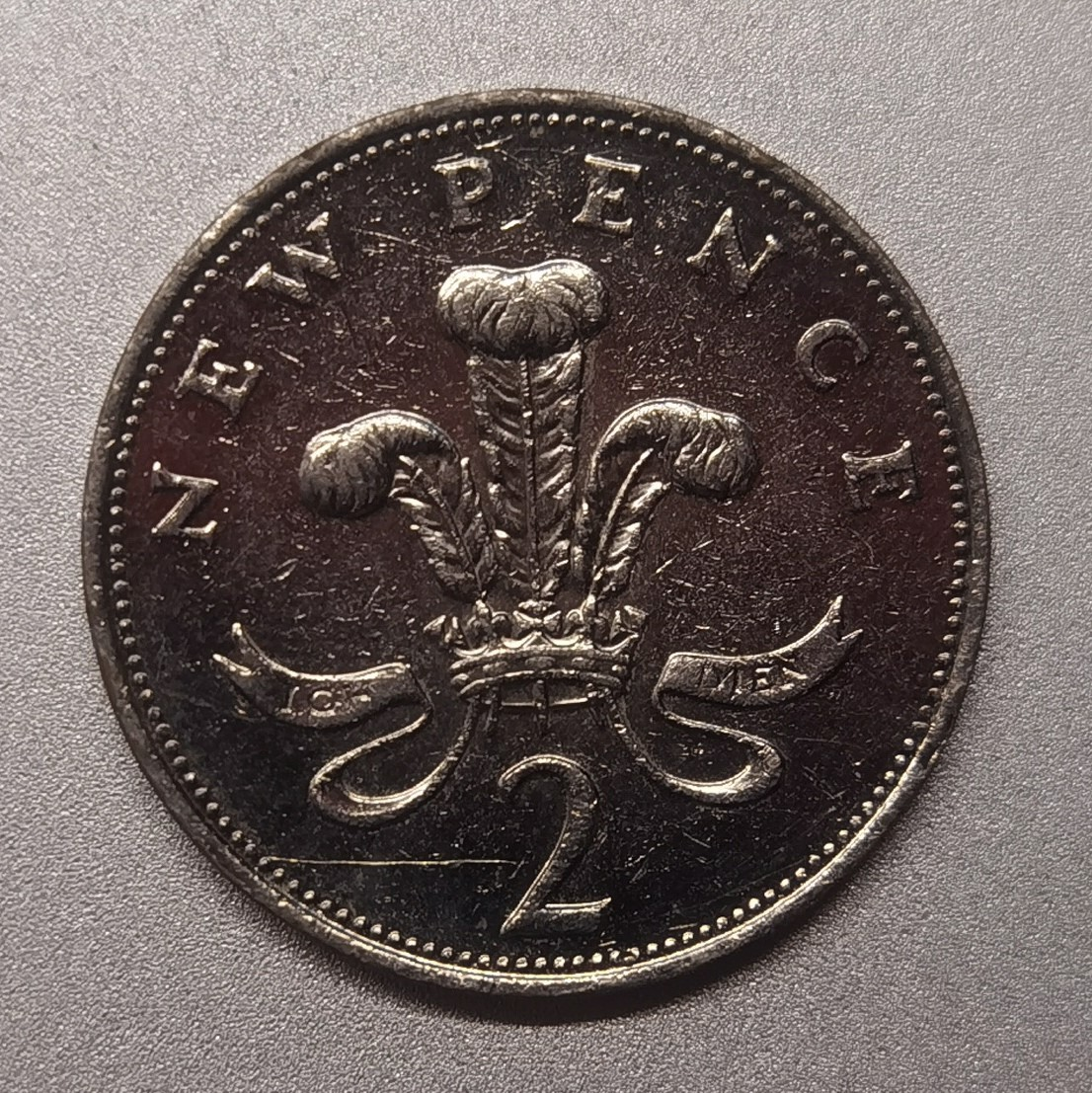
Silver two pence 1971

== Years of minting ==
- 1971: struck on cupro-nickel blank
- 1992 - 2018: cupro-nickel blank
- 2001: Copperless, appears duller than the others

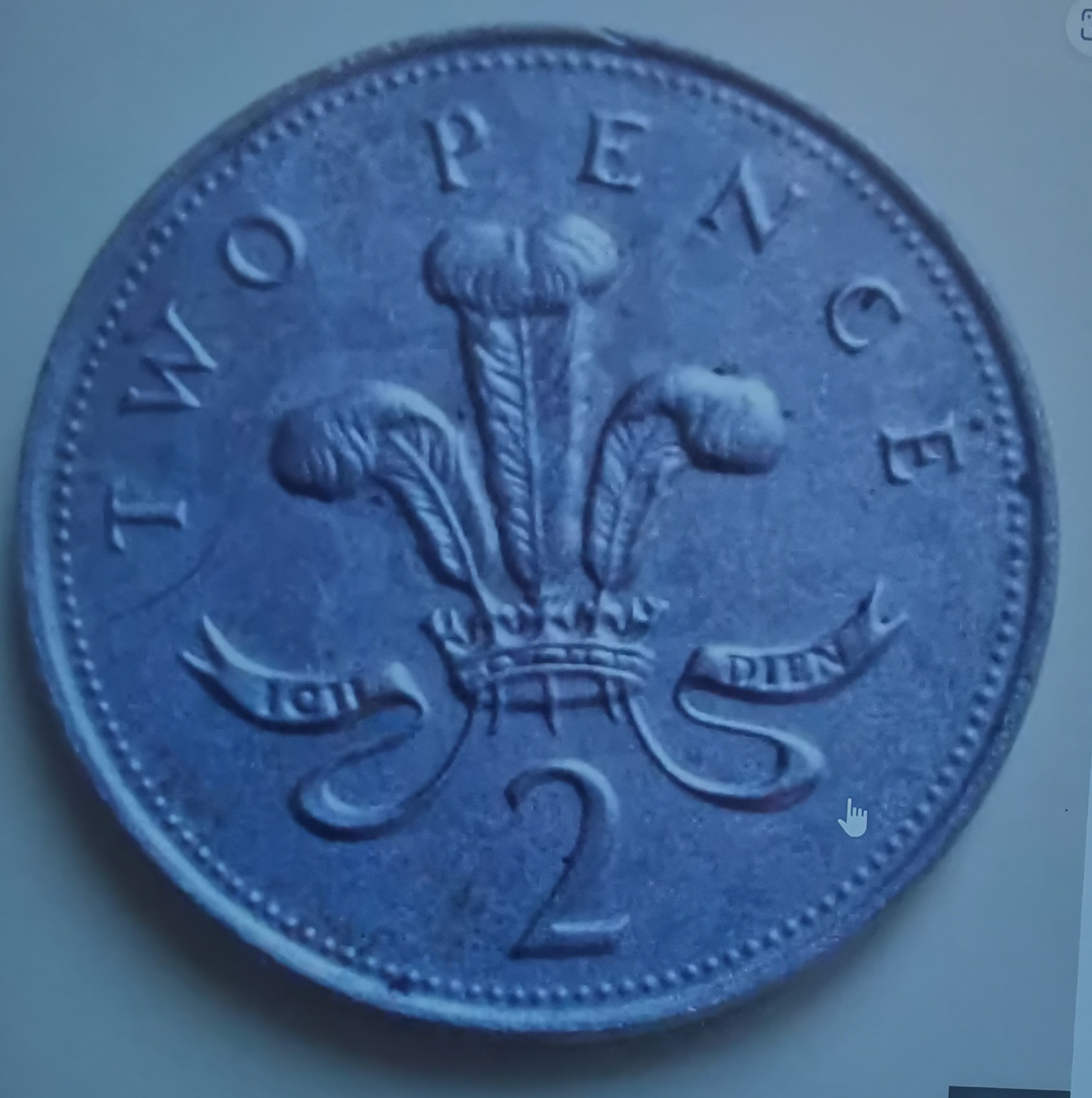
Silver 2 pence 2011 (note the dull colour)

== Occasions found ==
- 2014: A petrol station owner found a silver two pence in a new packet of coins minted in 1988. The coin sold for £1,200 at the Charterhouse Auction house in Sherborne.
- 2015: A 1971 silver two pence was found in the donation box for unwanted foreign currency at a hospital in Reading.
- 2016: A silver two pence was found in a Poppy Appeal tin. The mint confirmed that this two pence was set in nickel-plated steel usually used for ten pences. It is now owned by the Westminster Collection.
