= Connected Urban Development =

Connected Urban Development (CUD) is a private-public partnership, initiated in 2006 by Cisco in cooperation with the cities of Amsterdam, San Francisco, and Seoul, to work towards a further reduction of carbon emissions through improvements in the efficiency of the urban infrastructure. It follows on Cisco's commitment to the Clinton Global Initiative.

The CUD program initially involved three pilot cities: San Francisco, California; Amsterdam, The Netherlands; and Seoul, South Korea. These cities were selected because each had implemented or planned to implement a next-generation [broadband] (fiber and/or wireless) infrastructure. Other common factors are the significant traffic congestion issues each city faces and the fact that each is led by a visionary mayor already involved in green initiatives. In 2008 the three initial cities were joined by Lisbon, Hamburg, Madrid and Birmingham. Learnings from the CUD partnership should serve as a blueprint of best practices and methodologies that other cities can use as a reference. All cities involved are strongly relying on the use of information and communication technologies to achieve their goals.

CUD is an ongoing program, to deliver innovative, sustainable models for urban planning and economic development. The exchange of ideas is promoted through bi-annual conferences in which representatives of all participating cities meet, together with representatives of other interested cities. The first CUD Conference took place in February 2008 in San Francisco, the second is planned for Amsterdam in September 2008.
