= Brockage =

Type of error coin

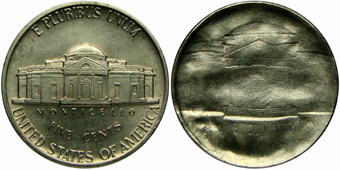
A reverse brockage on an American five cent piece, showing a mirror image of Monticello pressed into the obverse.

In coin collecting, brockage refers to a type of error coin in which one side of the coin has the normal design and the other side has a mirror image of the same design impressed upon it.

== Description ==
Brockage errors are caused when an already minted coin sticks to the coin die and impresses onto another blank that hasn't been struck yet, pressing a mirror image of the other coin into the blank. Brockages are relatively rare among modern coins of industrialised countries where mints exercise a strict production control and somewhat less rare among the modern coins of some developing countries which operate their own mint (e.g. Nepal); in good condition, coins with clear brockage are a collector's item and can sell for substantial amounts of money.

One can distinguish between obverse and reverse brockages. Obverse brockages occur when the previously struck coin was not ejected and gets stuck to the lower die, and reverse brockages when the previously struck coin remains stuck to the upper die.

== History ==
In the production of hammered coinage, brockages were very common, although largely restricted to obverse brockages, as the mint worker would likely notice if the coin was stuck in the reverse anvil die. If the mint worker did notice the brockage, they had the option of restriking it. There is no consensus among numismatists concerning the existence of restruck brockages, as they would appear similar to coins with heavily clashed dies.

The use of screw presses drastically reduced the amount of brockages which escaped the mint from the mid 16th-century onwards, but as high speed machinery became more common in the 19th century, more brockages appear. It is known that some unscrupulous mint workers have created brockages in the past simply in order to sell to coin collectors.

== See also ==
- Mint-made errors
- Coin collecting
