= Die-deterioration doubling =

Coin mint-made error

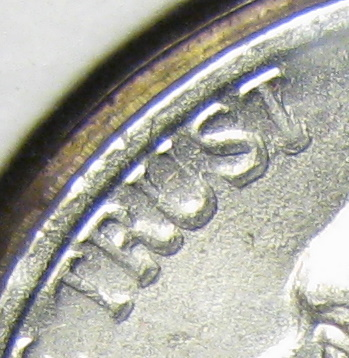
DDD on a 1999 P Jefferson nickel. Note the extended and irregular forms around the lettering.

Die deterioration doubling (DDD) is a common form of mint-made error on many United States and Canadian coins that results from degradation of the die used to strike the coin.

Due to a combination of improper preparation and treatment of the dies, excessive wear, and overuse, die deterioration doubling has occurred on nearly every series issued by the US mint in recent times. Certain coins are more susceptible to it than others, due to various factors, but it does occur on most series of coins.

== Causes ==
=== Annealing errors ===
During the annealing process of die making, two main errors can occur, resulting in less than perfect dies. It is impossible to tell without expensive and lengthy tests whether these errors occurred, but they will lead to significantly weaker dies and a higher tendency to deteriorate quickly. The first thing which can happen to a die in this process what metallurgists call decarburization. Decarburization is the result of an improper mix of metals and chemicals in the annealing furnace where the dies are sent to soften. If there is not enough ambient carbon in the furnace, the steel will give up some of its carbon and will become soft. The result is a thin surface of inadequate metal whose chemical composition has been altered and is below standard.

Another less obvious error can also occur when heating the dies. After being taken out of the annealing furnace, the dies must cool for 24 to 36 hours. They are usually given an oil bath to cool them more quickly, but the dies must still cool for a period of several hours. When the dies are cooling, if they are not stored properly or not allowed to fully cool before being used, the result is a much softer die. When the die is subjected to the hubbing press again and work hardened again, it will be softer and more susceptible to wear. If the die is softer because it was not fully cooled, it will not harden to the same standard as a die which has received proper treatment. However, there will not be a noticeable difference between a good die and a bad die; the change in the structure of the die is not apparent until it is used for a period of time.

=== Overuse of dies ===
In modern presses, a die strikes approximately 120 coins a minute. This is a large number of coins produced in a short time, and obviously the die cannot last forever. However, the process of wearing the die is only hastened by the metals used in coins. Nickel, one of the main metals used in today’s coins, is quite hard and causes wear quickly. Copper has been used for centuries because of its malleability and the ease with which it makes coins. However, it too wears the dies when they are used for too long. An infamous example is the 1955 "poorman’s double die." This coin is sold as a replacement for the 1955 doubled die cent, but it is no more than Die Deterioration Doubling, caused by wear on the dies.

When a coin is struck, the planchet is not heated. Although the planchet would be softer and more malleable, the extra time and expense would prove too great for the Mint. The planchet is therefore struck at room temperature, and the only thing which makes the coin form is the tremendous pressure used to strike it. With a metal such as nickel, which is harder than a normal coin metal like silver, gold or copper, the pressure must be greater. When a nickel coin, or any coin, is struck, the metal must "flow" into the contours of the front and back dies. It is through the atoms of the metal flowing into the dies that flow lines are created. However, when metal flows over a sharp corner in the die, like the edges of a mintmark or words, it tends to roll the detail out. It wears on the die, and a little detail is lost with every strike. Die Deterioration Doubling is most prevalent on the date and mintmark because these fine details are alone in the middle of the field, and the metal must flow into these without the help of other valleys nearby. When the metal rolls into the mintmark or date, it wears away the corner of the die, and after long enough will appear on the coin as Die Deterioration Doubling.

In addition, the mint has a practice of polishing the dies and using them longer. When a die begins to show evidence of wear, a mint technician will polish the die and reuse it. However, the die is still rapidly deteriorating, and polishing it cannot avoid the problem of wear. So, after many thousand coins in rapid succession, the wear on the die has gotten so bad that it appears as Die Deterioration Doubling.

== Identification ==
Die deterioration doubling is a result of a few simple causes, but it can be difficult to positively identify. There are a number of different features which appear similar, but the characteristic traits of each are easy to identify with practice. Die deterioration doubling is often mistaken for hub doubling. The causes of the two types of doubling are different, but their appearance on the finished coin is often similar. Die deterioration doubling appears most often around the mintmark and date because they are alone in the field. When it occurs in other features, like an image of a bust, it looks more like a weak strike than doubling.

Close examination of affected features show that the doubling is extremely irregular. This is because the coin metal does not flow from just one direction, but flows and produces wear on the die from all sides. There is no definite shape, and it can take on several different but similar appearances. It often looks like a thin metal shelf or spreading spot. It can also make lettering appear thick and twisted. There are no crisp lines affected, but things generally look bloated, enlarged, blurry, twisted, and damaged. This is different from hub doubling, because hub doubling appears as a crisp secondary image, rotated minutely from the original. When casually glancing at a coin, the difference is not easy to tell, but when magnified, the difference is obvious on most coins. Another easy way to tell hub doubling from die deterioration doubling is the presence of notched serifs; the small flairs on the ends of letters will appear distinctly separated with the former, whereas they appear just blurry and washed out with the latter.

== Types of die deterioration doubling ==
There really are two different kinds of DDD: Inside and Outside Abraded Die Doubling. This is because Die Deterioration Doubling manifests itself in two different ways. The two classes look different, and are caused by wear in two different places. Inside Abraded Die Doubling is caused by wear around the edges and inside the actual detail affected. It appears as an enlarged, irregular outline of the element overlapping the original design element. Outside Abraded Die Doubling is caused by actual wear in the field of the die. The field of a die is the highest point, so when a mint technician polishes the die or the metal flow of a coin wears it away, the field is the first thing to be worn down. The difference here is that Outside doubling does not overlap any of the original design, but rather appears like an irregular shelf around the object.

== Numismatic interest ==
Many beginning numismatists buy coins thinking they are very valuable, but really are not worth more than a little over face value due to a die deterioration doubling. This common error fools a number of people into believing that it is a much rarer, and more valuable, form of doubling. It goes by a number of names, such as the "poorman's double die".

Jefferson nickels and Lincoln cents especially exhibit a large number of affected coins, throughout the entire history of the coin. The 1955 "poorman’s double die" is actually outside abraded die doubling, and a high percentage of 1999 coins exhibit this error. Because of the large numbers of these coins in circulation, they are not worth more than a few cents over normal value. Nevertheless, die deterioration doubling can deceive the beginning numismatist with the high hopes of discovering a new variety and making a fortune.

== See also ==
- Die making
- Mint-made errors
