= 1955 doubled die cent =

U.S. minting error

- United States
- Value: $0.01 U.S. dollars
- Mass: 3.11 g
- Diameter: 19.05 mm (0.750 in)
- Edge: Plain
- Composition: 95% copper, 2.5% tin, 2.5% zinc
- Years of minting: 1955

Obverse
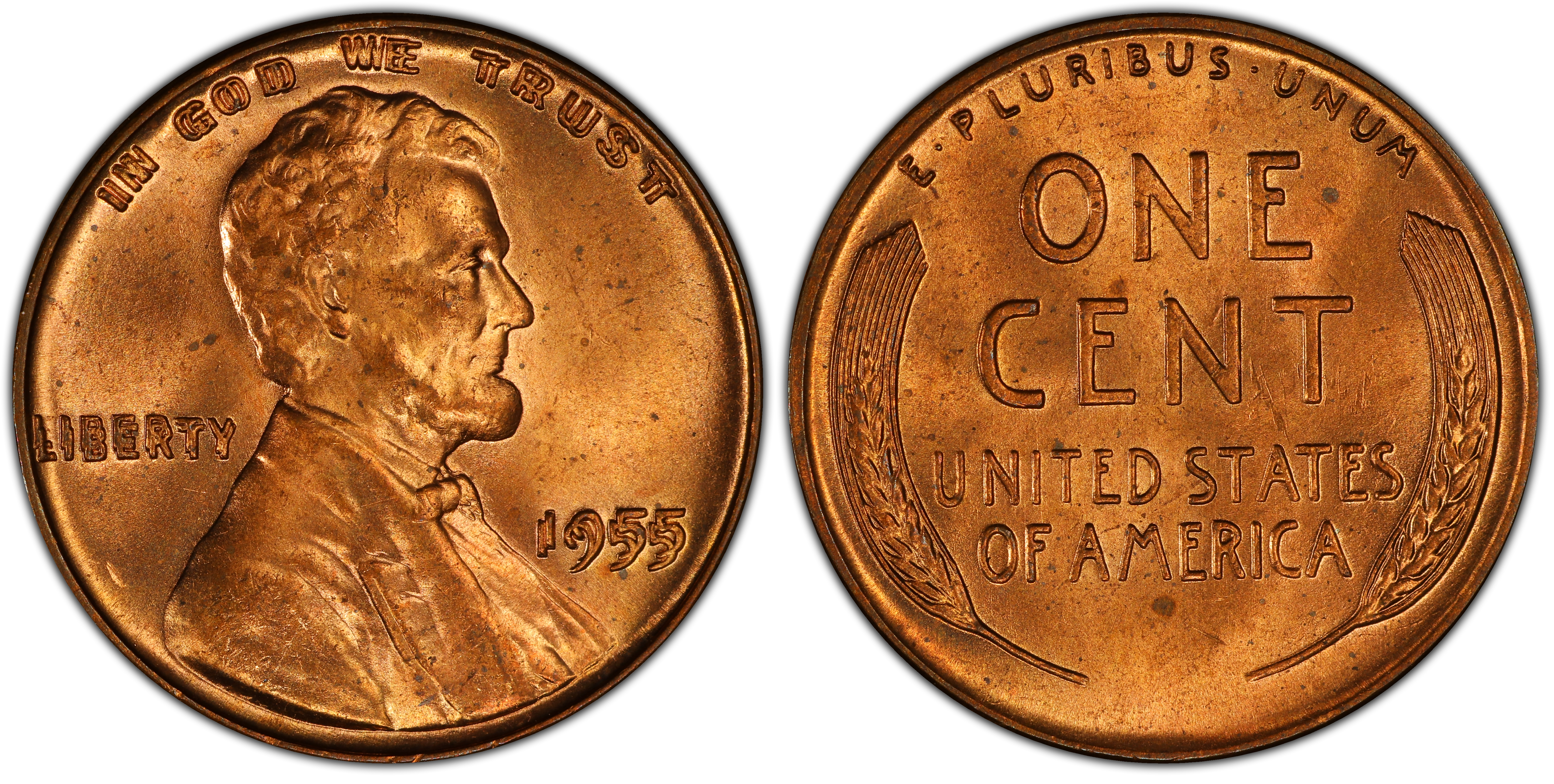
- Design: Abraham Lincoln
- Designer: Victor David Brenner
- Design date: 1909

Reverse
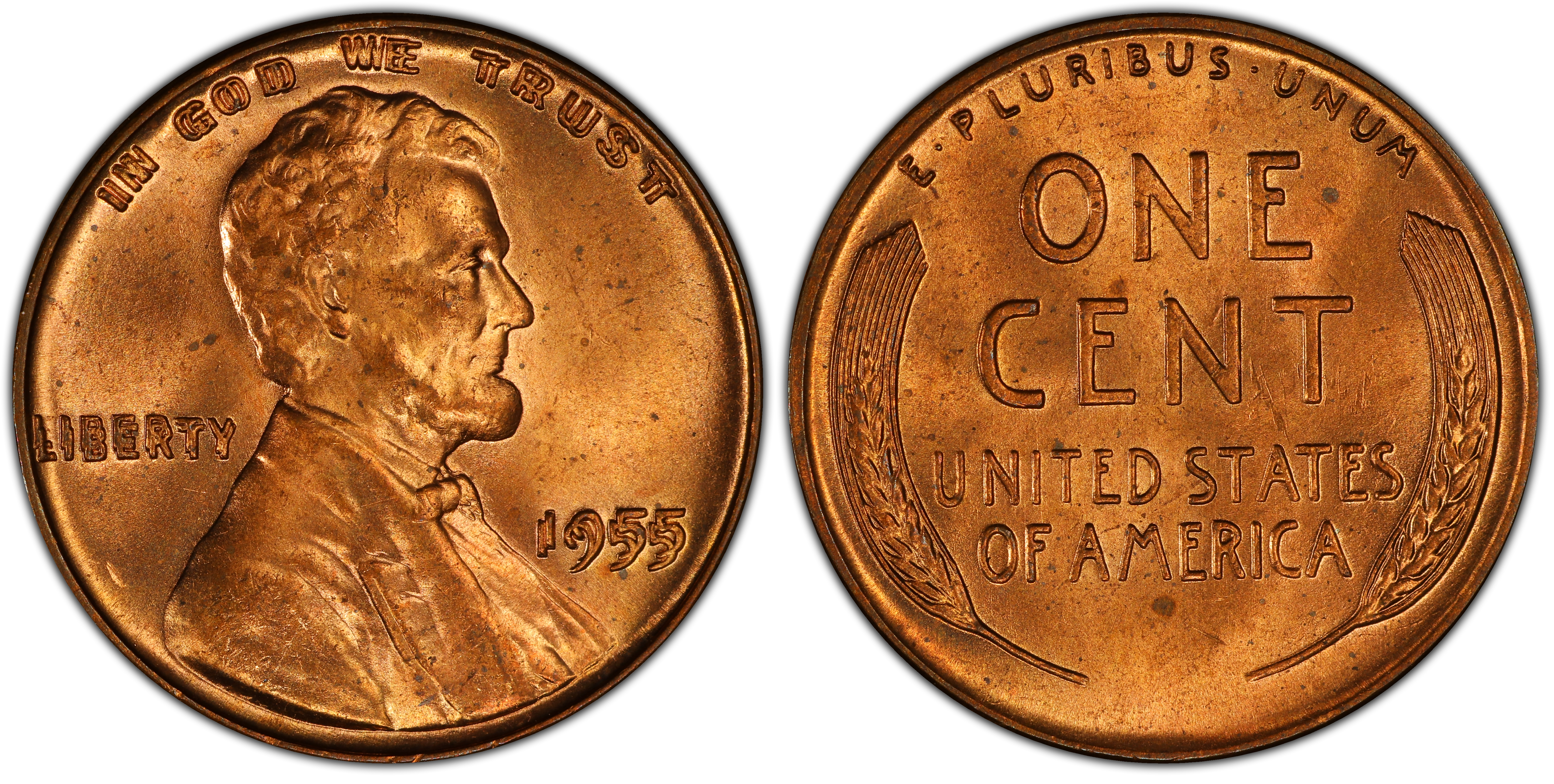
- Design: Wheat heads
- Designer: Victor David Brenner
- Design date: 1909

The 1955 doubled die cent is a die variety that occurred during production of the one cent coin at the United States Mint in 1955. It is considered one of the most famous die varieties in US coinage.

== Origins ==
When a modern coin die is created, it is struck from a working hub, which places the incuse image onto the die that will subsequently be used to strike coins. Normally, this requires multiple blows. In 1955, one of the working obverse dies at the Philadelphia Mint was misaligned on the second blow from the working hub, thus resulting in a doubled image. Due to the manner in which this hubbing was carried out, it most noticeably affected the date and inscriptions, with very little doubling (albeit noticeable loss of detail) visible on the bust of Lincoln. These doubled features were visible on all of the coins struck from this die. It is estimated that 40,000 of these coins were minted, all during one night shift at the Philadelphia Mint. Roughly 20,000–24,000 of the pennies were introduced into circulation after the minting error.

The 1955 doubled die is one of the most famous die varieties in US coinage. Very few exist today in totally mint condition, as almost all were discovered while in circulation. Over the years, many counterfeits of this coin have surfaced. It is advised for collectors to seek expert opinion before purchasing one of these coins if it has not been certified by one of the top numismatic certification companies.

A seemingly similar variety to the 1955 doubled die is the so-called 1955 "Poor Man's Doubled Die" cent, created by die deterioration doubling. It is caused when the design on a worn die becomes eroded and distorted, causing part of the design (such as the final digit of the date) to appear doubled. It is much more common than the actual doubled die, and as such it sells for only a few dollars.

== See also ==
- Doubled die
- Coin collecting
- Numismatics
