= Doubled die =

Effect in numismatics

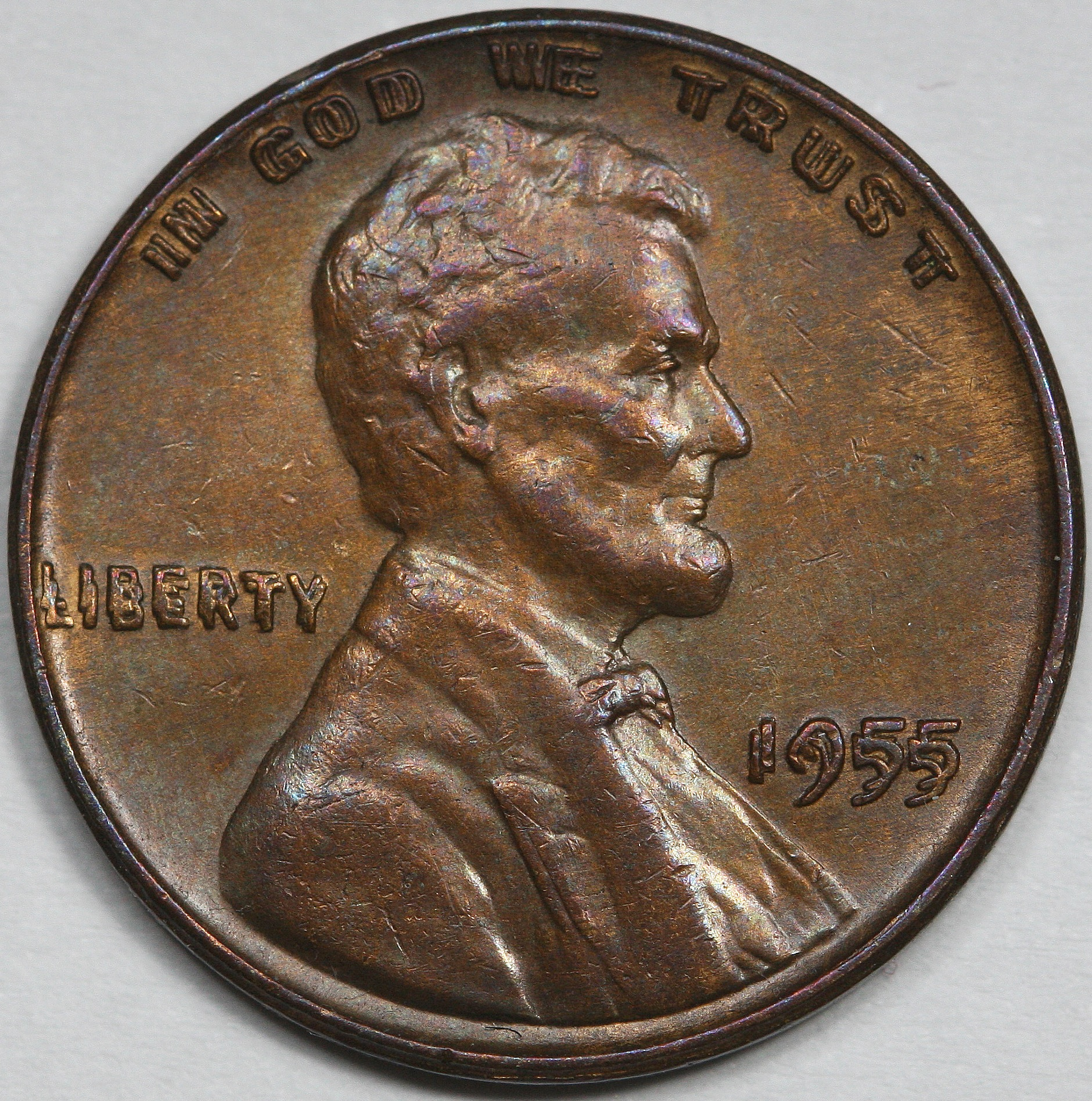
1955 doubled die Lincoln cent

In numismatics, doubled die (Note: Commonly misspelled "double die".) (also known as hub doubling) is a duplication of design elements on a working cie created due to a misalignment of the die or hub during the hubbing process. Strength of the doubling can vary from very slight and isolated to extreme and widespread. The exact cause of the doubling can also vary, which is why a class system was created to outline the known and hypothesized causes.

Doubled die varieties, when noticeable to the naked eye or occur in a popular coin series, are extremely popular with collectors and can be worth a large premium over the same coin without the doubling. The most popular doubled die variety would be the 1955 US cent doubled die which typically sells for over $1000 at auction.

== Classes of doubled dies ==
Doubled dies are created when the hub imprints an additional, misaligned image onto a die. The many ways this misalignment of images can occur have been arranged into eight classes. This class system was created when United States mints used a multiple-squeeze hubbing method, meaning the working dies were intentionally hubbed multiple times to transfer a complete image. Many mints worldwide, including the United States, have since transitioned to a single-squeeze method, expecting the elimination of this hubbing error as only one hubbing is needed. However, the frequency of doubled dies actually increased with the new method. These new single-squeeze doubled dies have slightly different characteristics than ones from the previous method, leading to different opinions on whether the class system has to be revised or not. Some believe the single-squeeze doubled dies still fit in the existing system while others added a new ninth class for single-squeeze doubled dies.

Class 1, Rotated
A class I doubled die results when the die receives an additional hubbing that is misaligned in a clockwise or counterclockwise direction.
Class 2, Distorted
A class 2 doubled die results when the hub's design moves toward the rim between hubbings.
Class 3, Design
A class 3 doubled die results when a hub bearing a different design stamps a die bearing another design.
Class 4, Offset
A class 4 doubled die results when the die receives an additional hubbing that is misaligned in an offset direction.
Class 5, Pivoted
A class 5 doubled die results when the die receives an additional hubbing that was misaligned via rotation with a pivot point near the rim.
Class 6, Distended
A class 6 doubled die results when the die receives an additional hubbing from a hub that was distended.
Class 7, Modified
A class 7 doubled die results when the hub is modified between the die's hubbings (e.g., a design element was chiseled off).
Class 8, Tilted
A class 8 doubled die results when a die and/or hub is tilted during a hubbing.

== United States coinage ==
An approximately 10x micrograph example of extreme doubling on the date of a coin.

Doubled dies are a result of the way in which the United States Mint's dies are created. Before 1997, die pairs (hammer die and anvil die) were made by hubs that contained the raised design elements that were intended to appear on the coin. The blank dies were heated (to soften them) and then were pressed against the hubs to transfer the design from the hub to the working dies. One impression was not enough in every case to transfer the design elements from the hub to the die, so multiple impressions were required to transfer enough of the design. For this reason, after the first impression was made, the die was reheated and prepared for a second impression. The mint workers would use guides to align the hub and the working die perfectly to prevent overlapping, or a doubled die. It is when mint workers failed to align dies properly during this process that doubled dies were produced. In many instances three to four impressions were required, which could but rarely led to tripled and quadrupled dies.

Modern coining methods have vastly reduced the frequency of these varieties due to the use of a single squeeze hubbing method during die creation, but doubled dies in modern United States coinage are still occurring. With the new die making process, implemented after 1996, dies only required one impression of the hub to transfer all of the design from the hub to the die. But it has been discovered that the pressure created is so great, that some dies tend to slightly rotate during this process.

Modern doubled dies in American coinage have been discovered mainly in Lincoln cents. The 2004 Peace Reverse Nickel shows doubling in the date, motto, designer initials and eyelid of Thomas Jefferson. The 2005 Bison Reverse Nickel, shows slight doubling in the word "Liberty" and in other devices of the coin.

== See also ==
- Die-deterioration doubling
- Coining
- Milled coinage
- Numismatic terminology
- Coin collecting
