= Hubbing =

Metalworking process used to make dies

Hubbing is a metalworking process that is used to make dies. It is a cold-working process, which means that it occurs well below the melting temperature of the metal being worked.

== Process ==
In hubbing, a male hub (master) is created with a profile that will form an impression on the female piece. The male hub is generally hardened and the female die block softened by annealing to help form the impression. As the metal flows the face of the die block is deformed, and, generally, must be machined flat. The die block is often a cylinder that is reinforced with a surrounding steel ring during the hubbing process. Hubbing is usually less expensive than die sinking, i.e., machining the female die, and multiple dies can be made from the male hub.

In the case of mild steel, a typical hubbing press exerts a pressure of approximately 1500 short tons-force per square inch (21 GPa) to transfer the image from a master hub into the master die.

== See also ==
- Coining (metalworking)
- Die making
