= Coining (mint) =

Manufacturing of coins using a kind of stamping

Minting, coining or coinage is the process of manufacturing coins using a kind of stamping, the process used in both hammered coinage and milled coinage. (Note: The term "coining" is also used in metalworking. See coining (metalworking).) This "stamping" process is different from the method used in cast coinage.

A coin die (archaically spelt dye) is one of the two metallic pieces that are used to strike a coin, one per each side of the coin. A die contains an inverse version of the image to be struck on the coin. Striking a coin refers to pressing an image into the blank metal disc, or planchet, and is a term descended from the days when the dies were struck with hammers to deform the metal into the image of the dies.

Modern dies made out of hardened steel are capable of producing hundreds of thousands of coins before they are retired and defaced. Scissel is the scrap produced in the punching of coin blanks from a continuous strip of metal.

== Ancient coin dies ==
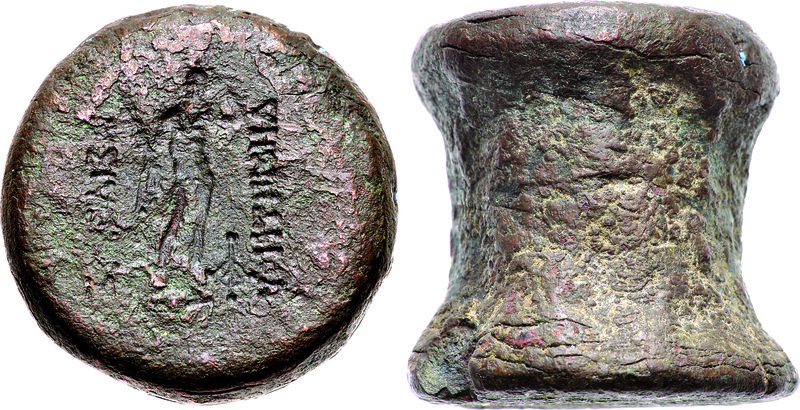
Reverse die for the coinage of Demetrius I of Bactria, 200–185 BCE

Prior to the modern era, coin dies were manufactured individually by hand by artisans known as engravers. In demanding times, such as the crisis of the Roman Empire in the 3rd century, dies were still used even when they became worn or even when they cracked. The die that was on the hammer side, usually the reverse (back), tended to wear out first. The planchets (blanks) were usually hot prior to striking. On some Roman provincial coins, some believe the tongs used to move the heated planchet left permanent center indentations on the finished coins. Others attribute these marks to surfacing tools used as a part of planchet preparation.

Experimental archeology suggests that a lower die could be expected to last for up to 10,000 strikes depending on the level of wear deemed acceptable. Upper dies seem to have a far greater range of lives with usable lives ranging from just over 100 strikes to nearly 8000 being reported. Combining archaeological evidence with historic records suggests ancient coin producers (in this case the Amphictions at Delphi) could get as many as 47,000 strikes out of an individual die.

== Medieval coin dies ==
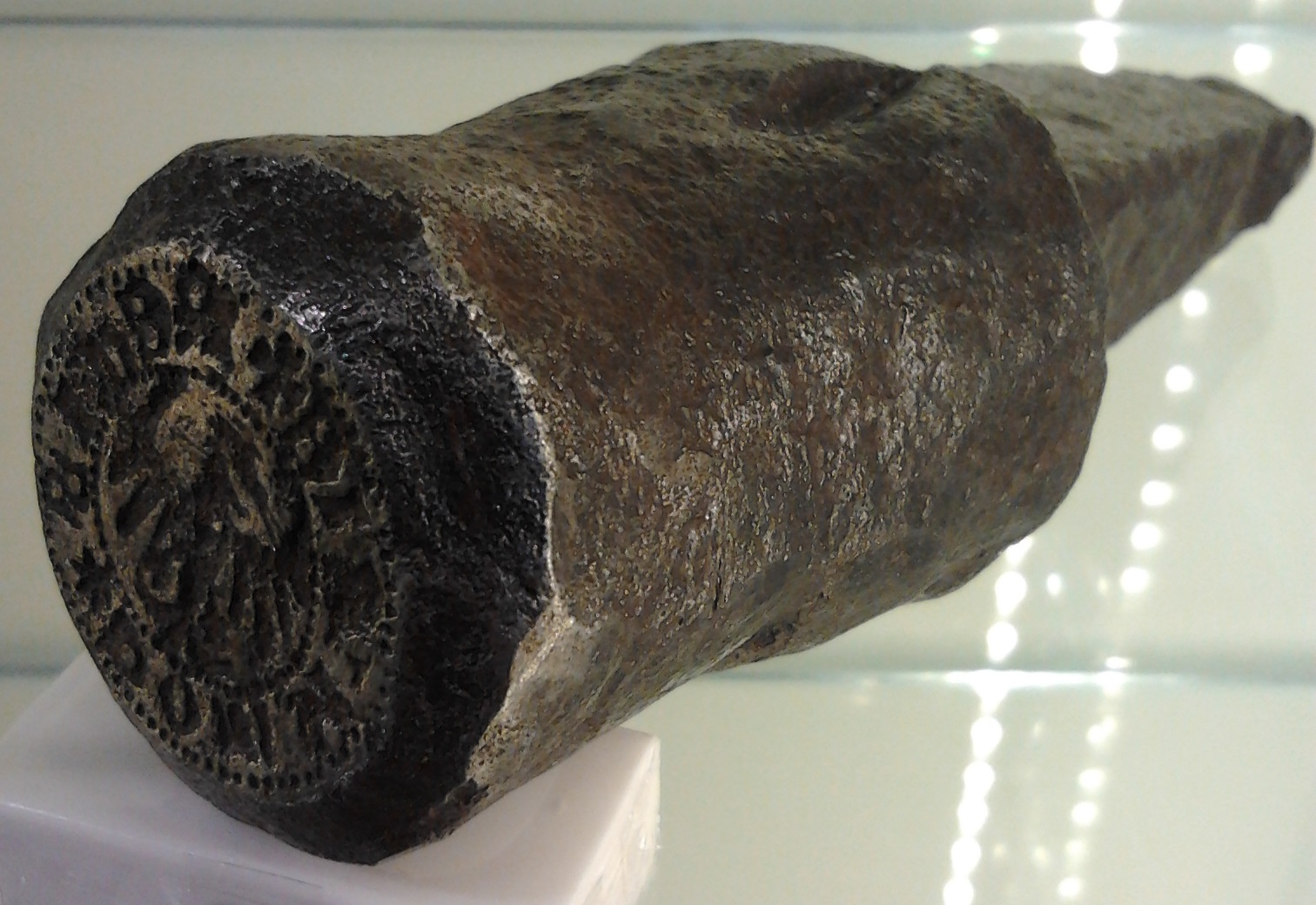
Coin die for a groat 1394-1398

Medieval engravers were guild members who created coins.

The vast majority of medieval coins were cold struck; the planchets were not heated. While medieval coin dies were largely made of iron, some dies have been discovered with a small region at the face of the die which is made of steel. As technology and the economy changed over the course of the Middle Ages, so did the techniques used to create coin dies. While most ancient coin dies used engraving heavily, early medieval coinage was dominated by dies created mostly from punches, which displace the metal of the die instead of removing it. There is evidence of medieval die cutters using engraving tools to lay out designs, and to create detailed punches. However, engraving on the face of the die did not become commonplace until the early Renaissance.

Detailed records exist for the Venetian mint. Located in the heart of the city, the Zecca of Venice served as a hub for commercial life and patronage at the time. In the late Middle Ages, the dies used to create tornesellos lasted as follows: "hammer" die, ~17,000 strikes; "anvil" die, 36,000 strikes. The mint made an average of 20,000 coins per day, so they were making one hammer die a day and one anvil die every other day. The "hammer" dies wore out quicker because they tended to be smaller and were hit directly with a hammer, leading to severe mushrooming on the tops. The Venetian Mint's most important coin was the Silver Grosso, a coin modeled after coins produced in the Byzantine Mint. It was from the Byzantium mint that the Venetian mint was modeled after. The decline of the Silver Grosso began under the rule of doge Andrea Dandolo in 1343. His rule saw the rise of the Gold Ducat, almost eliminating the silver Grosso entirely.

== Modern die production ==
=== Note about spelling ===
In the time of Samuel Pepys in the 17th century, the spelling "dye" was used, a spelling which persisted in some quarters to the 20th century.

=== Production methods ===
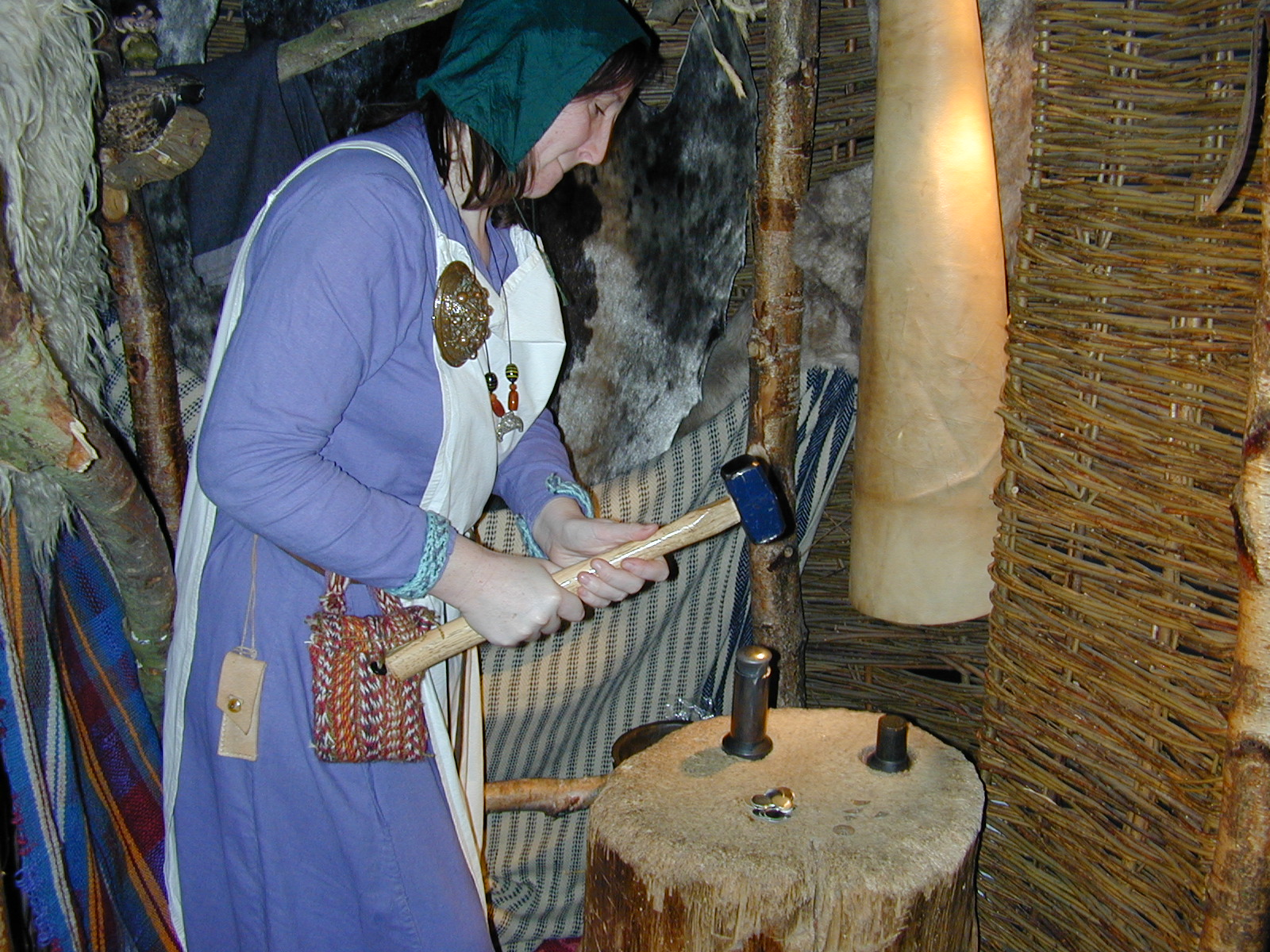
Viking reenactors showing coin production

First, an artist creates a large plaster model of the coin. The plaster model is then coated with rubber. The rubber mold is then used to make an epoxy galvano. All of this takes place on a scale of around eight inches. Next, a reducing machine takes several days to reduce the image onto a steel master hub. The master hub is then heat treated to make it hard. The master hub is then used to make only a few master dies via hubbing, which involves pressing the master hub into a steel blank to impress the image into the die. The master die is then used to form as many working hubs as needed through the same process, and then the working hubs are put through the same process to form the working dies. These working dies are the actual dies which will strike coins. The process of transferring the hub to the die can be repeated as many times as necessary in order to form the number of dies needed to make the number of coins required. The difference between a hub and a die is that the hub has a raised image and a die has an incuse image, so one forms the other.

When making working dies, the Mint has found that by using a lower amount of pressure in the hubbing press, they can prolong the life of the hubs and dies used. In between each hubbing, however, the die being made must be subjected to an annealing procedure to soften the steel, making it easier to force the hub's image into the die. As the die is being cold forged in the hubbing press, work hardening makes the hubbed die harder and stronger than in its original state (an advantage over engraving the die).

If, when the die is subjected to another hubbing, it is not lined up exactly with the hub, the result is a secondary image, or doubling. This is called die doubling, and results in such spectacular coins as the famous 1955 doubled die cent.

== The third side of the coin ==
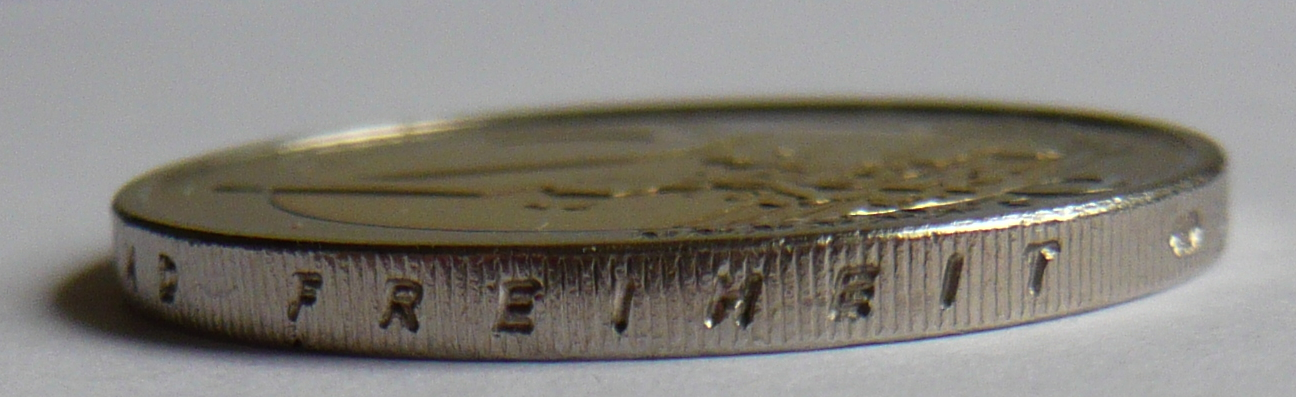
Milled edge of a German 2 euro coin, embossed with Germany's unofficial national motto "Einigkeit und Recht und Freiheit"

On the edge of the US dime, quarter and half dollar, and a number of world coins there are ridges, similar to knurling, called reeds. Some older US coins, and multiple world coins have other designs on the edge of the coin. Sometimes these are simple designs like vines, more complex bar patterns or perhaps a phrase, as on the United States dollar coin, on which are the date, mintmark, and motto, E Pluribus Unum. In more recent history, these kinds of designs are imparted into the coin through a multisectioned third die called a collar die or collar, whose inner edge diameter is the same as that of the edge of the coin. When the obverse and reverse dies strike the planchet the planchet expands to fill the collar, impressing the collar design into the edge of the coin. The collar sections are then separated to allow the coin to be removed. When the collar is missing, it results in a type of error called a broadstrike. A broadstruck coin is generally a bit flatter and quite a bit bigger around than the regular non-error coin of the same denomination. A second and faster process by which a design is applied to the edge of a coin is by use of an edge incusing machine. The struck coin is fed into the machine and the machine then pressed the design into the edge of the coin. Sometimes a mint will use both methods to apply an edge design. The U.S. Mint, for example, used an edge incusing machine to letter the edges business strike presidential dollars and a collar for the proof versions of these coins.

== Die marriage ==
During a typical production run, or coining process, (particularly when heavy presses are used for large production runs) a die is selected out of a group of several dies for the front and another die is selected from a different group of dies for the back of the coin to be made. The mint employee then places each die into the minting press for operation. When the run is complete, the dies are removed from the press. This procedure is repeated for each production run. Coins minted by each mint for each year may have several production runs in order to complete their orders.

If there is more than one die used for either the front or the back, then minute differences between each die can be identified. This is usually only for Early U.S. coins, as modern coin dies are made using computers, so unless there is an error coin die, all of the dies are identical. In addition, the relative positioning between the back and the front can also be used to determine which dies were used for the run that produced a particular coin. In the United States, coins are typically minted head to tail; that means the "top" of one side of the coin is on the exact opposite side of the coin as the "bottom" of the other, resulting in the coin's features being presented right side up when the coin is rotated on a horizontal axis. This is called a "coin turn" alignment. Correct alignment for a "coin turn" is exactly 180 degrees; however due to realities of machine process, this can vary by a fraction of a degree. In rare cases, this deviation can be up to several degrees, and easily noticeable. However, even very small deviations can establish the production run in which a coin was minted. When this is done, it is called a die marriage. Die marriage is particularly important with regards to the US half dollar minted at the New Orleans Mint in 1861, since it establishes if a coin was minted with the mint facility under Union, State of Louisiana, or Confederacy control.

== Use ==
In modern presses, a die strikes approximately 120 coins a minute. This rapid coining causes wear on the dies. Nickel alloys are among the main metals used in today's coins but they are harder than other legacy coinage metals such as silver and gold alloys and therefore they cause even quicker die wear. Copper and copper alloys have been used in coinage for centuries because of their malleability and the ease with which they can be coined: however, these too wear the dies when the dies are used for too long. An infamous example is the 1955 "poorman's double die". This coin is sold as a replacement for the 1955 doubled die, but it is no more than die-deterioration doubling, caused by wear on the dies. When a coin is struck, the planchet is not heated. Although the planchet would be softer and more malleable, the extra time and expense would prove too great for the mint. Thus, the metal cold flows into the die under the high pressure.

Mistakes can happen at any stage of this manufacturing process, and these mistakes are something that certain collectors look for. Coin errors that occur on the die are generally more desirable than errors made at the time of the strike. For example, a doubled die, where a date or another device appears twice slightly offset, is often a highly desired error. Strike errors are generally unique, whereas all coins struck with an error die will have the same characteristic. This makes them more easily collectible. The most famous doubled die in the past hundred years is the 1955 doubled die Lincoln cent. These trade for hundreds of dollars because the error can easily be seen by a casual observer. A number of doubled die errors require at least a jeweler's loupe to be seen. Doubling can occur at the hub stage as well. Some more recent errors are hub doubled. Most famously, there is a 1995 doubled die cent that is hub doubled.

== Terminal die state ==
The terminal die state, as the name would seem to indicate, is the last state in which any die is used. This is the state of a die that is starting to develop serious structural failures through cracks. A die in such a state would, if not removed from service, become unserviceable by breaking apart. Like any metallic part, dies are subject to failure from the enormous pressures used to impress the image of the die onto the blank planchet. Some dies were removed when even a microscopic defect is observed, while others were used until they literally broke into pieces. The Bass Foundation has a particularly noteworthy example of an 1806/4 Quarter Eagle ($2.50 gold US coin) in which a piece of the die has broken away, resulting in a heavy rim break over the "LI" in "LIBERTY" on the front.

More typically, a terminal die state will result in crack-like structures appearing on the coin. A good example can be observed on an 1839 Liberty Seated Dime. A crack-like feature is clearly seen going through the date, the shield, and the second star. This crack-like structure appears like material that is overlaid onto the surface of the coin; this is because the crack on the die allowed the planchet materiel to flow into it during stamping, just like a deliberate design feature. Some coins exhibit multiple crack-like features, indicating a die that is close to the end of its serviceable life. Coins that do exhibit such features can be labeled as “Terminal Die State” examples.

== Coin die represented in other coins ==
A coin die itself, has been the main motive for multiple collectors coins and medals. One of the most recent and famous one, is the Austrian 700 Years City of Hall in Tyrol coin, minted on January 29, 2003. The reverse side of the coin shows the Guldiner silver coin. However, the design is negative, representing a coin die, as a reference to Hall's history as a significant centre for minting coins.

== See also ==
- Mint (coin)
- Moneyer
