= Rim (coin) =

The rim of a coin is the raised parts of the coin's faces which completely encircle the perimeter of both obverse and reverse sides. Not to be confused with the edge of the coin, which is also known as its "third side".

Classical minting forms the rim as the die strikes the face of the coin blank, forcing metal outward against a surrounding collar, which then forces the metal upward into the space left by a chamfered edge of the die, and any gap between die and collar, making a sharp raised border around the coin's design. The raised rim reduces wear on the face of the coin.

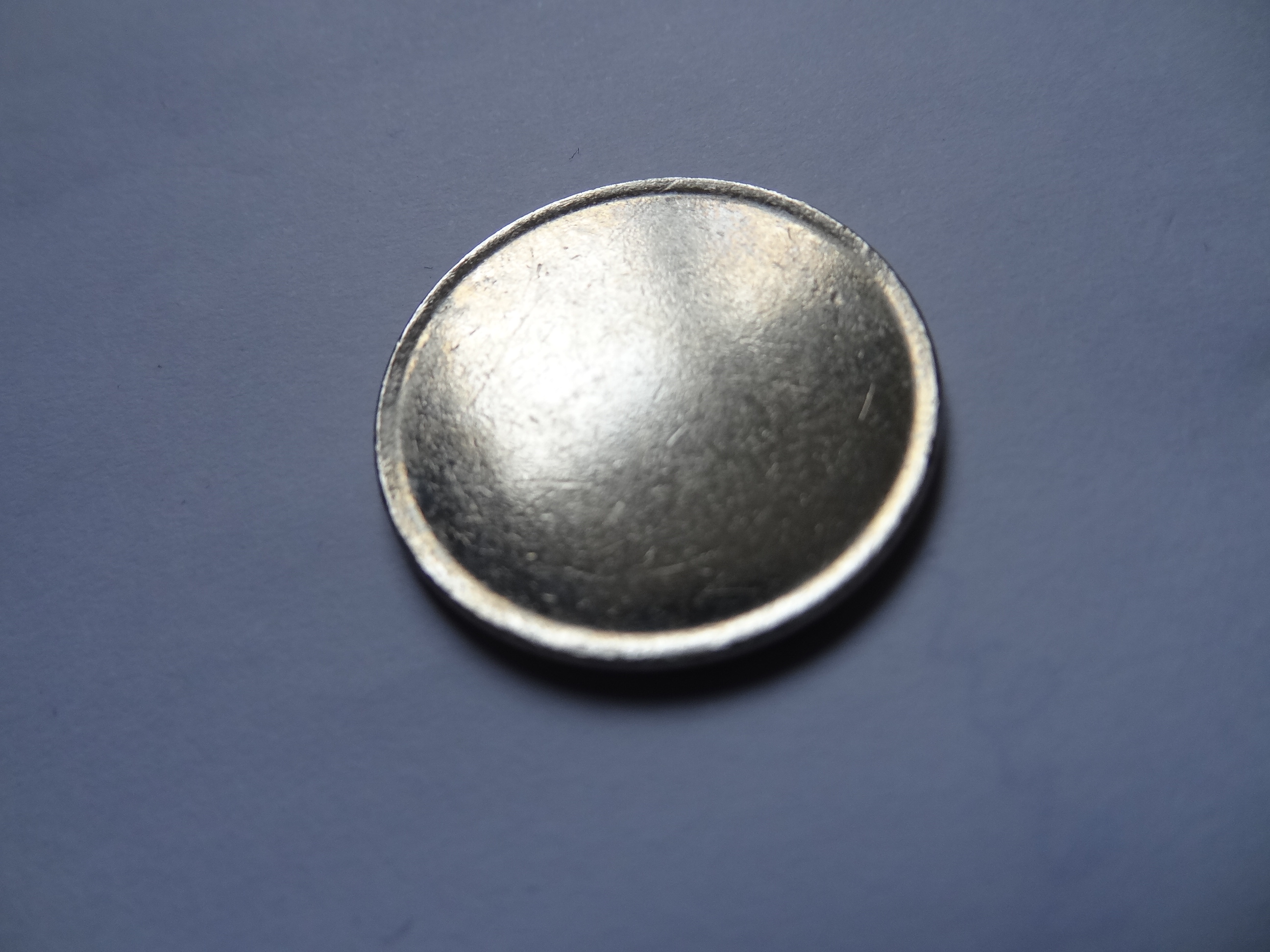
A blank rimmed planchet.

This can be done in a single stamping, but to reduce wear on the main coining dies, it was common to form the rim in a separate upsetting step with more durable blank dies. The name "planchet" is often reserved for the product of this first stamping operation.

An alternate upsetting process, used by modern mints, instead feeds slightly oversized blanks into a tapered slot between a rotating central drive wheel and a fixed outer ring. (Like planet gears in epicyclic gearing.) As the blanks proceed around the ring, they are progressively squeezed to form the rim. This may be applied before or after coining the faces, and may apply a reeded edge using patterned rollers like knurling.

== See also ==
- Coin edge
- Milled coinage
