= Close collar minting =

Close collar minting is a method of coin manufacture that is used almost exclusively today. With close collar minting, the planchet is centred within a solid metal collar during the minting process.

This restraining collar prevented the expansion of the planchet sideways and outwards and thus made it possible to mint completely round coins for the first time. These could also have a slightly raised edge (edge bar) and an edge inscription without additional milling. The edge minting made possible with the new technology is not only difficult to forge; it also increases the circulation security of the coins, since coin clipping is very easily noticed. A pearl circle often adjoins the edge bar on the inside.

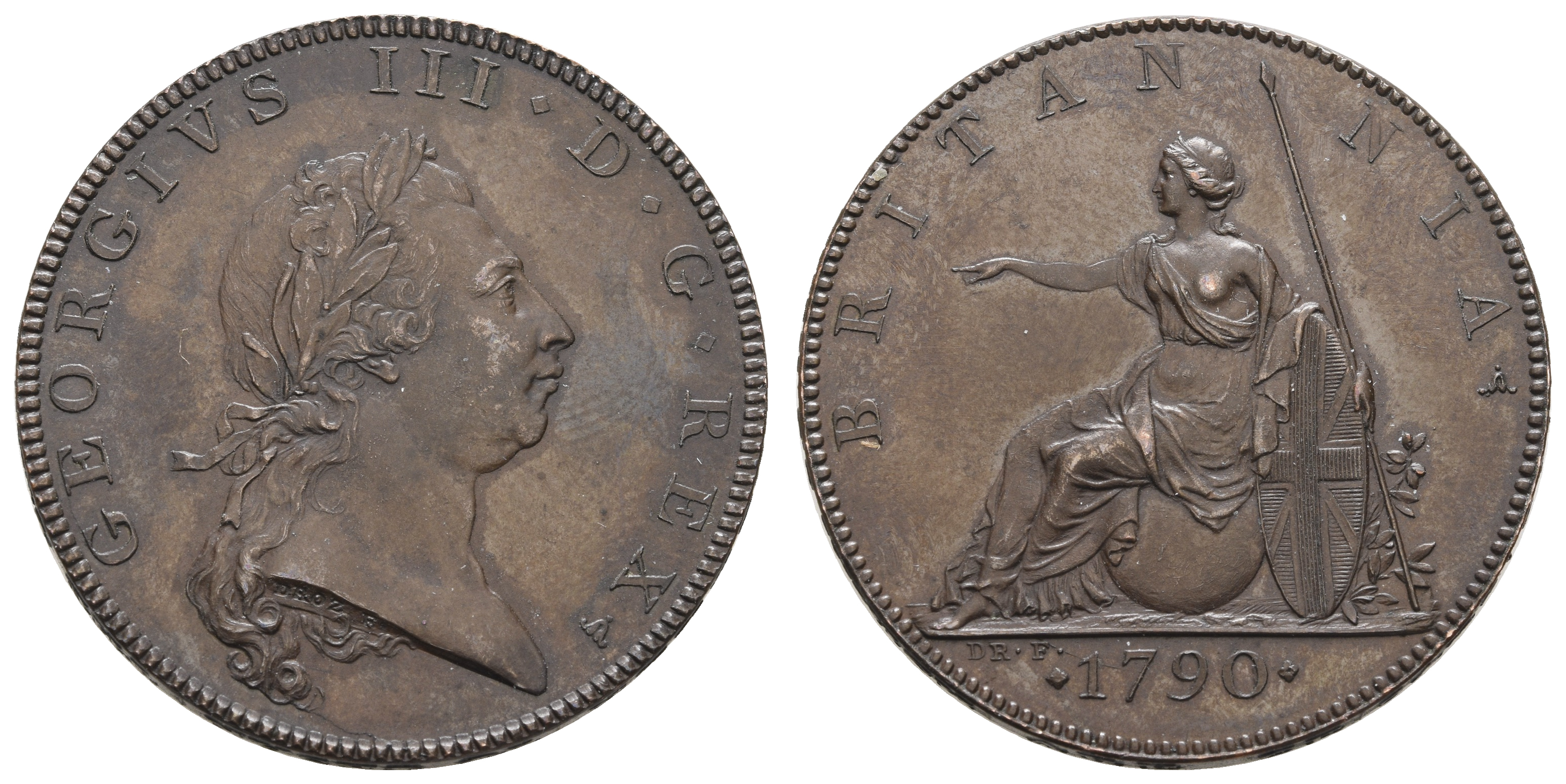
Cu-Pattern Halfpenny George III by Jean-Pierre Droz, struck in 1790 at Soho Mint, with raised edge inscription: RENDER TO CESAR THE THINGS WHICH ARE CESARS

Close collar minting is an invention of French medalist and engraver Jean-Pierre Droz (1746–1823). Its prototype of a functional minting machine had a six-part minting ring.

Close collars were used for the first time in the new Soho Mint. In Germany, Prussia systematically promoted such coinage via the German Customs Union from the middle of the 19th century.

== Literature ==
- Ewald Junge (1977): Droz, Jean-Piere. "Circular minting". In: Tyll Kroha (main author) Lexikon der Numismatik. Bertelsmann Lexikonverlag, Gütersloh. p. 121.
- Gerhard Welter (1977): "Circular minting". In: Tyll Kroha (main author) Lexikon der Numismatik. Bertelsmann Lexikonverlag, Gütersloh. p. 370.
