= Pearl circle =

Beaded pattern used on coins

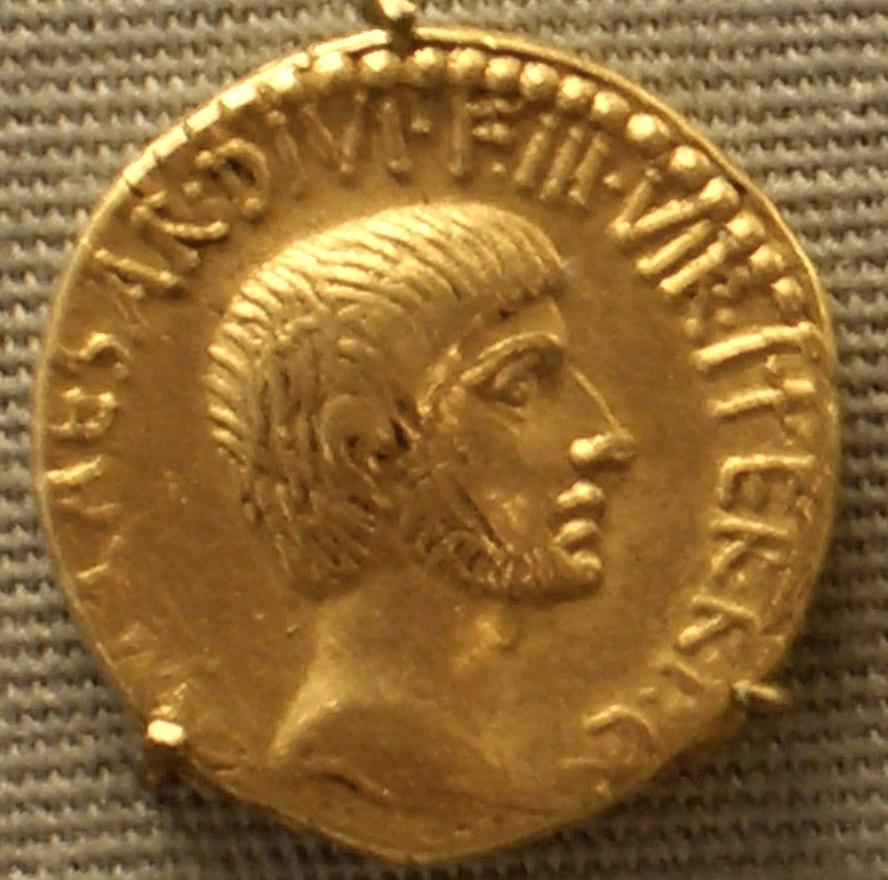
Roman Aureus (36 BC AD Z.) with incompletely embossed pearl circle

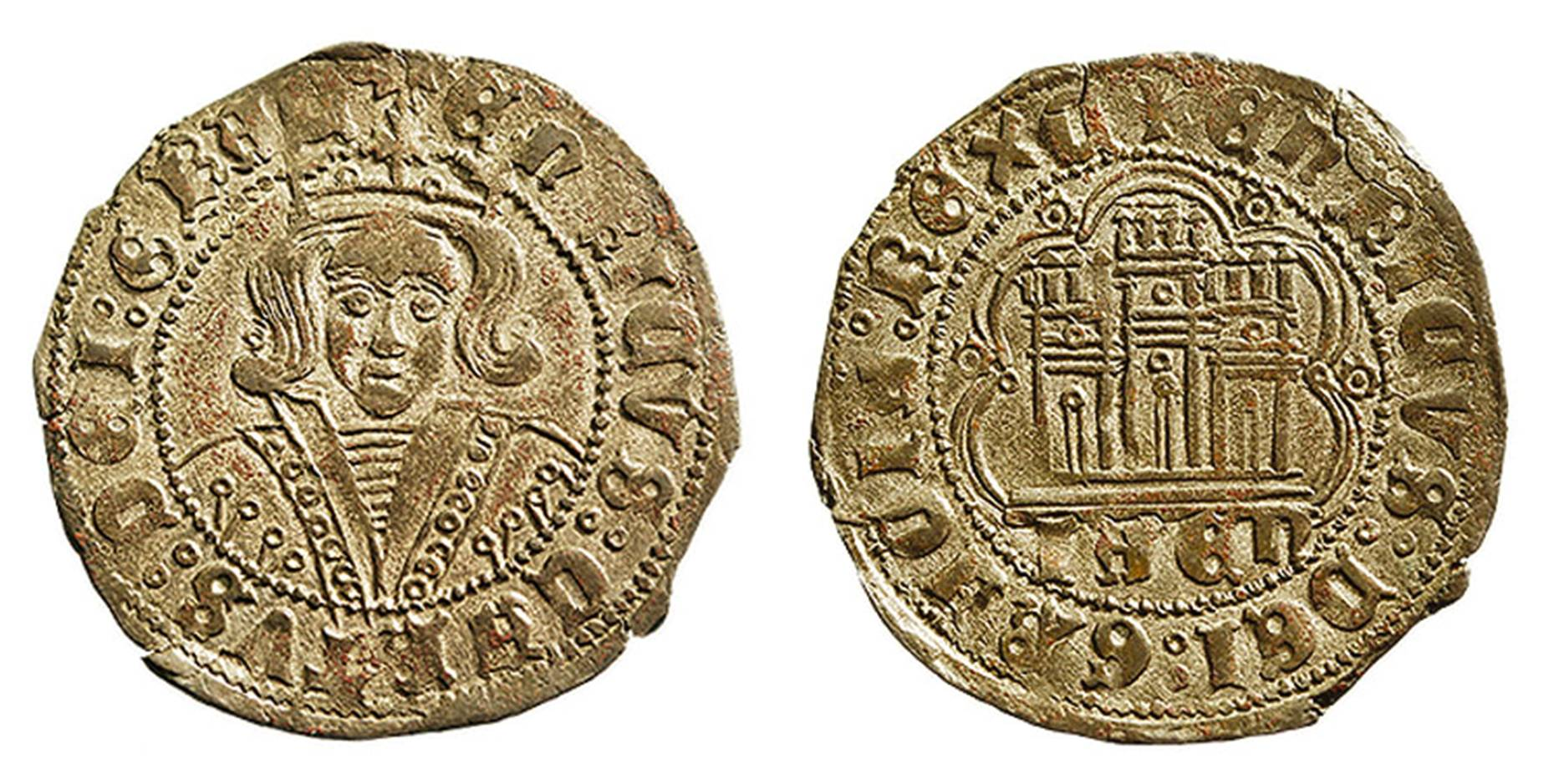
Castilian Maravedi (c 1475) with bead and reel

A pearl circle (also pearl rim or pearl ring; French grènetis, German Perlkreis, Perlrand, Perlreif) is a circular arrangement of fine, raised points or "pearls" on the edge of coins; it also sometimes appears in round or oval frames. It can be considered a relative or subsidiary form of the bead and reel motif.

== Shape ==
If there is a pearl circle or a string of pearls on coins, it usually encloses the entire coin design. The pearl circle can be on one or both sides of a coin. In addition to a simple beaded wreath, there are also double or multiple beaded circles. There are also variants that do not have circular beads or that show an alternating pattern of beads and other simple geometric figures.

== Function ==
Pearl circles (later also small edge bars) were not only decorative, but they also served to protect the coin from forgeries and coin clipping and thus from depreciation.

== History ==
The pearl circle appeared as early as the Greek coins of antiquity. It is widespread on Roman coins from both Republican and Imperial times. Byzantine coins also often have a pearl circle.

From the 19th century onwards, the introduction of close collar minting made it possible to emboss a raised rim slightly overhanging the coin design. This edge bar often ends inwards with a beaded circle. The German Coinage Act of 9 July 1873 stipulated that silver coins of the German Empire had to have a pearl circle.

== Literature ==
- von Schrötter, Friedrich, ed. (1930): Wörterbuch der Münzkunde ("Dictionary of Numismatics"). De Gruyter, 2nd unchanged edn. Berlin. (1970 reprint).
