= Obverse and reverse =

Front and back sides of coins and other two-sided objects

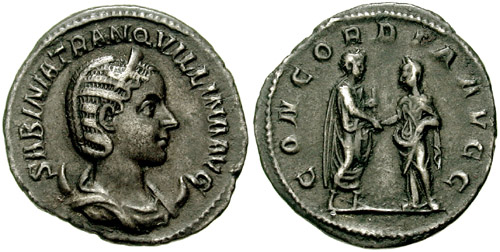
Roman Imperial coin of Tranquillina, struck c. 241, with her portrait on the obverse and her marriage to Gordian III depicted on the reverse in smaller scale; the coin exhibits the obverse – "head", and reverse – "tail" – a convention that still dominates much coinage today. Legends: SABINIA TRANQVILLINA AVG / CONCORDIA AVGG.

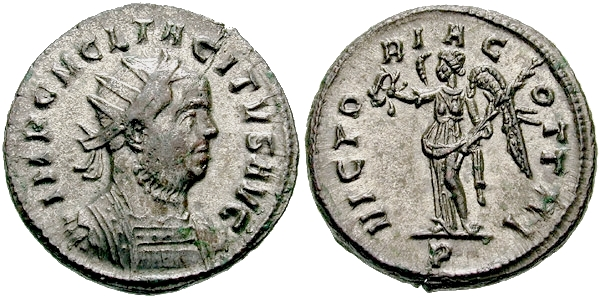
A Roman imperial coin of Marcus Claudius Tacitus, who ruled briefly from 275 to 276, follows the convention of obverse and reverse coin traditions. Legend: IMP C M CL TACITVS AVG / VICTORIA GOTTHI

The obverse and reverse are the two flat faces of coins and some other two-sided objects, including paper money, flags, seals, medals, drawings, old master prints and other works of art, and printed fabrics. In this usage, obverse means the front face of the object and reverse means the back face. The obverse of a coin is commonly called heads, because it often depicts the head of a prominent person, and the reverse tails. The surface between the faces is the edge.

In numismatics, the abbreviation obv. is used for obverse, while rev., ℞, and ~~)(~~ are used for reverse. Vexillologists use the symbols "normal" for the obverse and "reverse" for the reverse. The "two-sided", "mirror", and "equal" symbols are further used to describe the relationship between the obverse and reverse sides of a flag.

In fields of scholarship outside numismatics, the term front is more commonly used than obverse, while usage of reverse is widespread.

The equivalent terms used in codicology, manuscript studies, print studies and publishing are "recto" and "verso".

== Identification ==
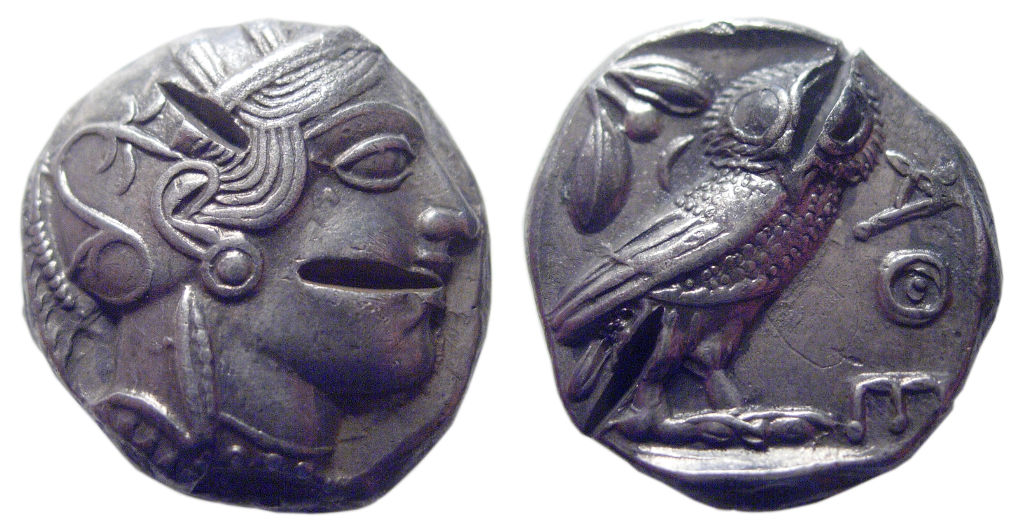
On this tetradrachm of Athens, struck in the mid 5th century BC, the head of Athena is regarded as the obverse because of its larger scale and portrait; the entire owl is depicted in a smaller scale on the reverse. Legend: ΑΘΕ[ΝΑΙOΝ], ie "of Athenians".

Generally, the side of a coin with the larger-scale image will be called the obverse (especially if the image is a single head) and, if that does not serve to distinguish them, the side that is more typical of a wide range of coins from that location will be called the obverse. Following this principle, in the most famous of ancient Greek coins, the tetradrachm of Athens, the obverse is the head of Athena and the reverse is her owl. Similar versions of these two images, both symbols of the state, were used on the Athenian coins for more than two centuries.

In the many republics of ancient Greece, such as Athens or Corinth, one side of their coins would have a symbol of the state, usually their patron goddess or her symbol, which remained constant through all of the coins minted by that state, which is regarded as the obverse of those coins. The opposite side may have varied from time to time. In ancient Greek monarchical coinage, the situation continued whereby a larger image of a deity, is called the obverse, but a smaller image of a monarch appears on the other side which is called the reverse.

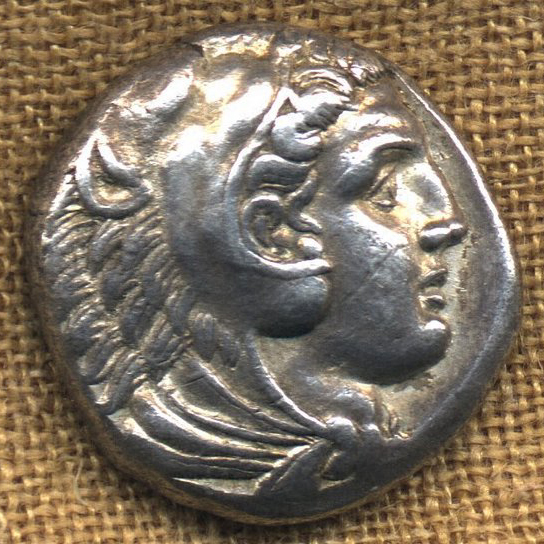
Obverse of the tetradrachm of Alexander the Great, intended to be seen as a deity, wearing the attributes of the hero Heracles. Struck in 325 BC.

In a Western monarchy, it has been customary, following the tradition of the Hellenistic monarchs and then the Roman emperors, for the currency to bear the head of the monarch on one side, which is almost always regarded as the obverse. This change happened in the coinage of Alexander the Great, which continued to be minted long after his death. After his conquest of ancient Egypt, he allowed himself to be depicted on the obverse of coins as a god-king, at least partly because he thought this would help secure the allegiance of the Egyptians, who had regarded their previous monarchs, the pharaohs, as divine. The various Hellenistic rulers who were his successors followed his tradition and kept their images on the obverse of coins.

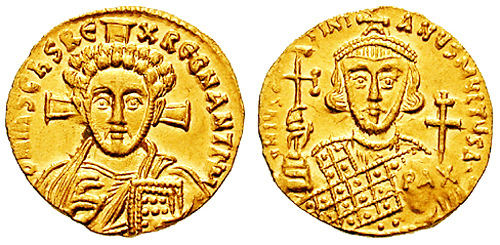
Solidus of Justinian II struck after 705. A stylized Christ is on the obverse, with the emperor on the reverse. Legend: D[OMI]N[US] IHS[US] CH[RI]S[TOS] REX REGNANTIUM / D[OMI]N[US] IUSTINIANUS MULTUS A[ΝΝΙ].

A movement back to the earlier tradition of a deity being placed on the obverse occurred in Byzantine coinage, where a head of Christ became the obverse and a head or portrait (half or full-length) of the emperor became considered the reverse. The introduction of this style in the gold coins of Justinian II from the year 695 provoked the Islamic Caliph, Abd al-Malik, who previously had copied Byzantine designs, replacing Christian symbols with Islamic equivalents, finally to develop a distinctive Islamic style, with just lettering on both sides of their coins. This script alone style then was used on nearly all Islamic coinage until the modern period. The type of Justinian II was revived after the end of the Byzantine Iconoclasm, and with variations remained the norm until the end of the Empire. Without images, therefore, it is not always easy to tell which side will be regarded as the obverse without some knowledge.

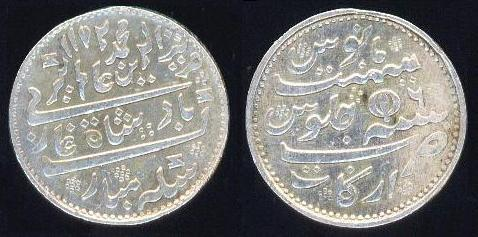
Silver rupee using Mughal conventions, but minted by the British East India Company Madras Presidency between 1817 and 1835. On rupees, the side that carries the name of the ruler is considered the obverse.

After 695, Islamic coins avoided all images of persons and usually contained script alone. The side expressing the Six Kalimas (the Islamic profession of faith) is usually defined as the obverse.

A convention exists typically to display the obverse to the left (or above) and the reverse to the right (or below) in photographs and museum displays, but this is not invariably observed.

== Modern coins ==
The form of currency follows its function, which is to serve as a readily accepted medium of exchange of value. Normally, this function rests on a state as guarantor of the value: either as trustworthy guarantor of the kind and amount of metal in a coin, or as powerful guarantor of the continuing acceptance of token coins.

Traditionally, most states have been monarchies where the person of the monarch and the state were equivalent for most purposes. For this reason, the obverse side of a modern piece of currency is the one that evokes that reaction by invoking the strength of the state, and that side almost always depicts a symbol of the state, whether it be the monarch or otherwise.

If not provided for on the obverse, the reverse side usually contains information relating to a coin's role as a medium of exchange (such as the value of the coin). Additional space typically reflects the issuing country's culture or government, or evokes some aspect of the state's territory.

== Specific currencies ==
=== Coins of the Eurozone ===
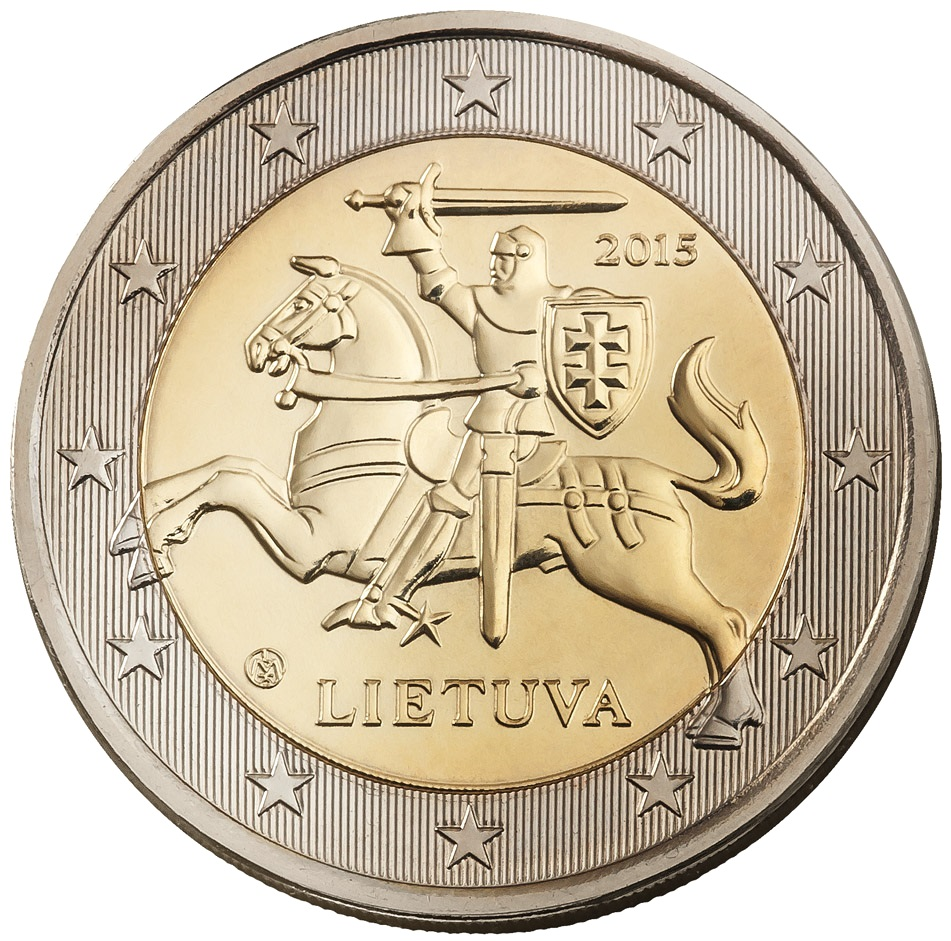
National side (obverse) of a Lithuanian €2 coin

Regarding the euro, some confusion regarding the obverse and reverse of the euro coins exists. Officially, as agreed by the informal Economic and Finance Ministers Council of Verona in April 1996, and despite the fact that a number of countries have a different design for each coin, the distinctive national side for the circulation coins is the obverse and the common European side (which includes the coin value) is the reverse. This rule does not apply to the collector coins as they do not have a common side.

A number of the designs used for obverse national sides of euro coins were taken from the reverse of the nations' former pre-euro coins. Several countries (such as Spain and Belgium) continue to use portraits of the reigning monarch, while the Republic of Ireland continues to use the State Arms, as on its earlier issues.

=== Coins of Japan ===
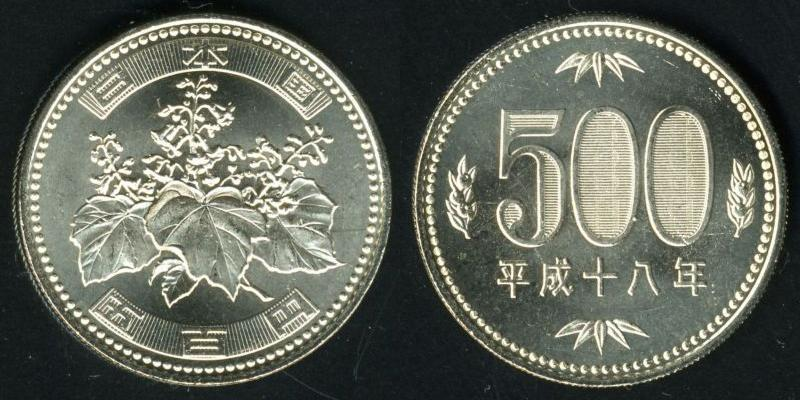
¥500 coin, the obverse showing a Paulownia plant, the reverse showing the value "500", and the year 2006 (平成十八年, heisei juu-hachi nen)

In Japan, from 1897 to the end of World War II, the following informal conventions existed:

- the Chrysanthemum Throne (or Chrysanthemum Crest), representing the imperial family, appeared on all coins, and this side was regarded as the obverse;
- the other side, on which the date appeared, was regarded as the reverse.

The Chrysanthemum Crest was no longer used after the war, and so (equally informally):

- the side on which the date appears continues to be regarded as the reverse;
- the side without the date is regarded as the obverse.

=== Coins of the United Kingdom ===
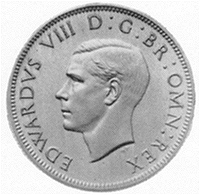
A left-facing portrait of Edward VIII on the obverse of a UK coin, which would have broken tradition if circulated

Following ancient tradition, the obverse of coins of the United Kingdom (and predecessor kingdoms going back to the Middle Ages) almost always feature the head of the monarch.

By tradition, each British monarch faces in the opposite direction of his or her predecessor; this is said to date from 1661, with Charles II turning his back on Oliver Cromwell. Hence, George VI faced left and Elizabeth II faced right. The only break in this tradition almost occurred in 1936 when Edward VIII, believing his left side to be superior to his right (to show the parting in his hair), insisted on his image facing left, as his father's image had. No official legislation prevented his wishes being granted, so left-facing obverses were prepared for minting. Very few examples were struck before he abdicated later that year, and none bearing this portrait were ever issued officially. When George VI acceded to the throne, his image was placed to face left, implying that, had any coins been minted with Edward's portrait the obverses would have depicted Edward facing right and maintained the tradition.

Current UK coinage features the following abbreviated Latin inscription: D[EI] G[RATIA] REX F[IDEI] D[EFENSOR] ('By the Grace of God King, Defender of the Faith'). Earlier issues, before 1954, included BRIT[ANNIARUM] OMN[IUM] ("of all the Britains" – that is, Britain and its dominions) and, before 1949, IND[IAE] IMP[ERATOR] ('Emperor of India').

=== Coins of the United States ===
The United States specifies what appears on the obverse and reverse of its currency. The specifications mentioned here imply the use of all upper-case letters, although they appear here in upper and lower case letters for the legibility of the article.

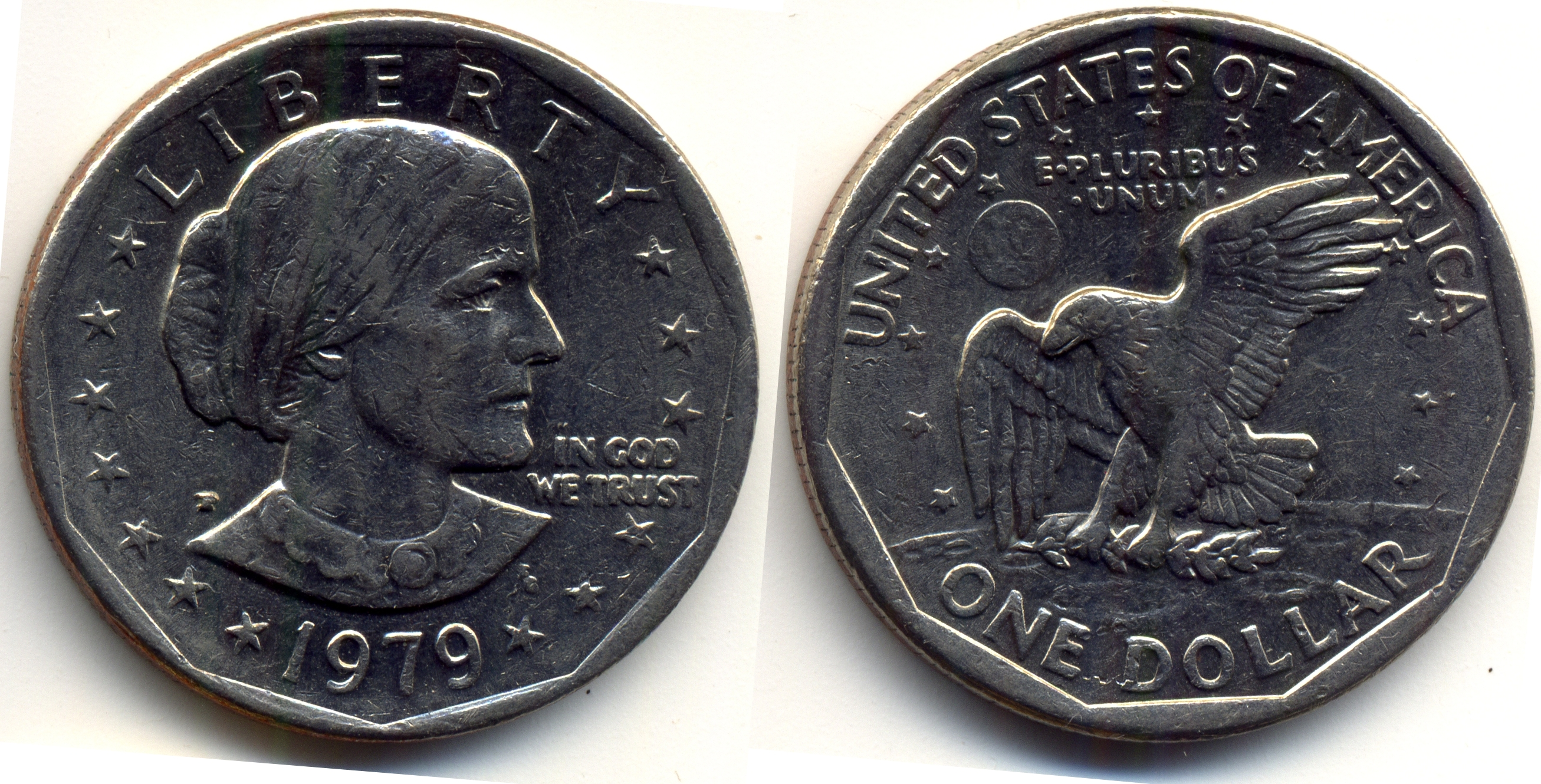
Susan B. Anthony dollar, with the obverse side showing Susan B. Anthony, the words "Liberty" and "In God We Trust", and the year 1979; the reverse side shows the words "one dollar", "United States of America", and "E Pluribus Unum", and retains the imagery of the Apollo 11 mission insignia, previously used on the Eisenhower dollar.

The United States government long adhered to including all of the following:

- Obverse:
  - "Liberty"
  - "In God We Trust"
  - The four digits of a year, that of minting or issue
- Reverse:
  - "United States of America"
  - "E Pluribus Unum"
  - Words (not digits) expressing the name or assigned value of the item, e.g., "quarter dollar", "one dime", "five cents"

The ten-year series of Statehood quarters, whose issue began in 1999, was seen as calling for more space and more flexibility in the design of the reverse. A law specific to this series and the corresponding time period permits the following:

- Obverse:
  - as before:
    - "Liberty"
    - "In God We Trust"
  - instead of on the reverse:
    - "United States of America"
    - The words expressing the assigned value of the coin, "quarter dollar"
- Reverse:
  - as before:
    - "E Pluribus Unum"
  - instead of on the obverse:
    - The four digits of the year of issue

== Vexillology ==
In vexillology, the obverse of a flag is the side taken as the default illustration of a flag, for example the side used to display a design in a book or other paper document. The obverse is usually assumed to be the side visible when the hoist, the edge attached to the mast, is on the viewer's left and the opposite fly side to their right, while the reverse is the side visible with the hoist on the right and the fly on the left. Most flags reversed feature a mirror copy of the obverse, a format accommodated by most flag manufacturers.

The flag of Saudi Arabia is an exception to both conventions, with a right-hoisted ("sinister") obverse and an equal reverse to correctly arrange the calligraphic Shahada on both sides. Truly two-sided flags include the flag of Paraguay and the flag of Oregon, but are otherwise rare in the modern day.

Some national flag protocols include provisions for when and how the reverse should be displayed. The United States flag code states that a vertically hung flag should be displayed with the reverse side out, such that the blue canton, or "union", be visible in the same position as it would be if the flag was being displayed horizontally on the obverse.

== See also ==
- Coin collecting
- Coin flipping
- Coin orientation
- Fair coin
- List of people on coins
- Recto and verso of paper or page
