= Bead and reel =

Beadlike decoration motif

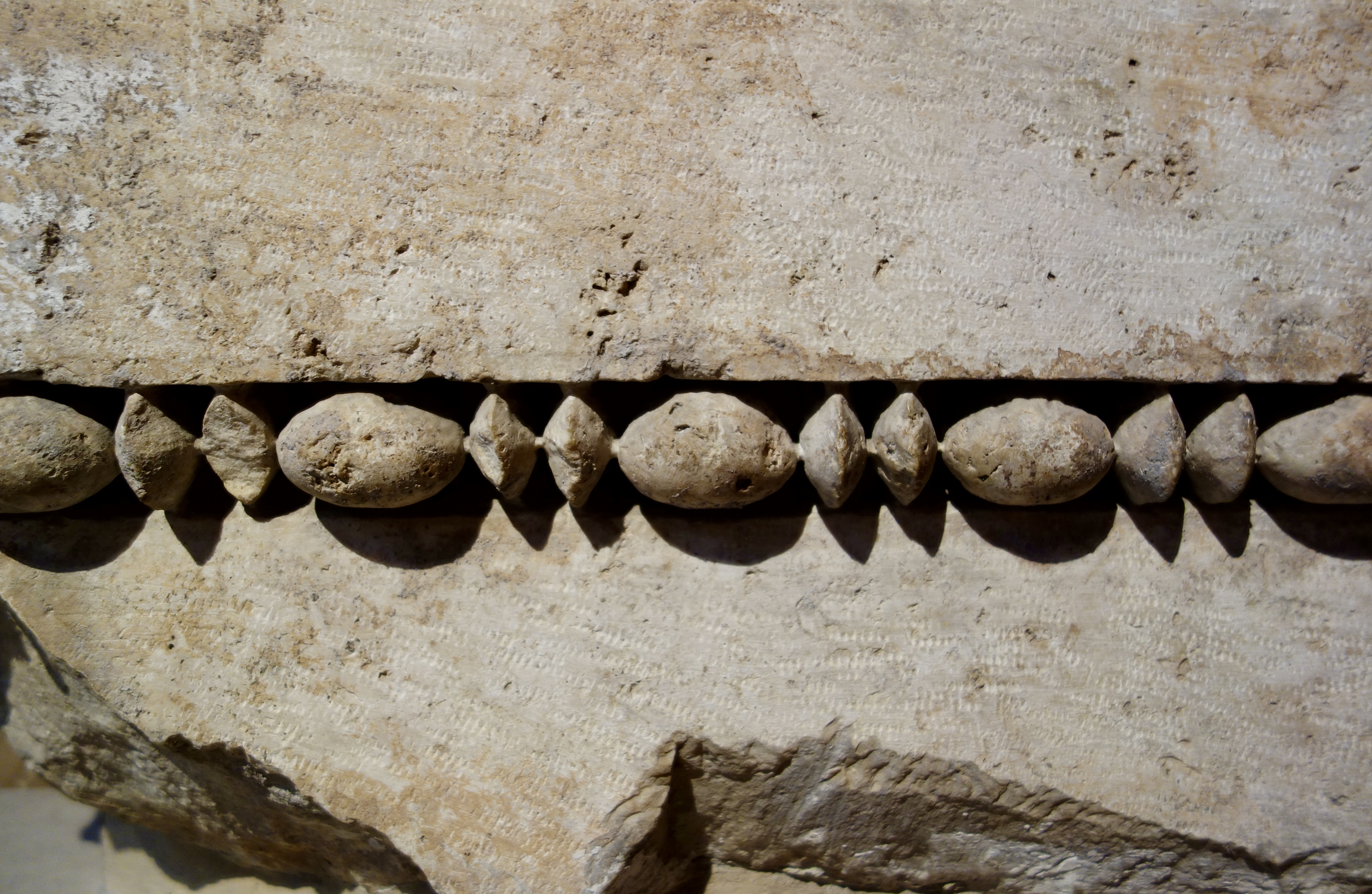
Roman bead and reel on a fragment of the entablature from the courtyard colonnades of the Sanctuary of Jupiter Heliopolitanus, Baalbek, Lebanon, 2nd century AD, limestone, Pergamon Museum, Berlin

Bead and reel is an architectural motif, usually found in sculptures, moldings and numismatics. It consists in a thin line where beadlike elements alternate with cylindrical ones. It is found throughout the modern Western world in architectural detail, particularly on Greek/Roman style buildings, wallpaper borders, and interior moulding design. It is often used in combination with the egg-and-dart motif.

According to art historian John Boardman, the bead and reels motif was entirely developed in Greece from motifs derived from the turning techniques used for wood and metal, and was first employed in stone sculpture in Greece during the 6th century BC. The motif then spread to Persia, Egypt and the Hellenistic world, and as far as India, where it can be found on the abacus part of some of the Pillars of Ashoka or the Pataliputra capital. Bead and reel motifs can be found abundantly in Greek and Hellenistic sculpture and on the border of Hellenistic coins.

== Gallery ==
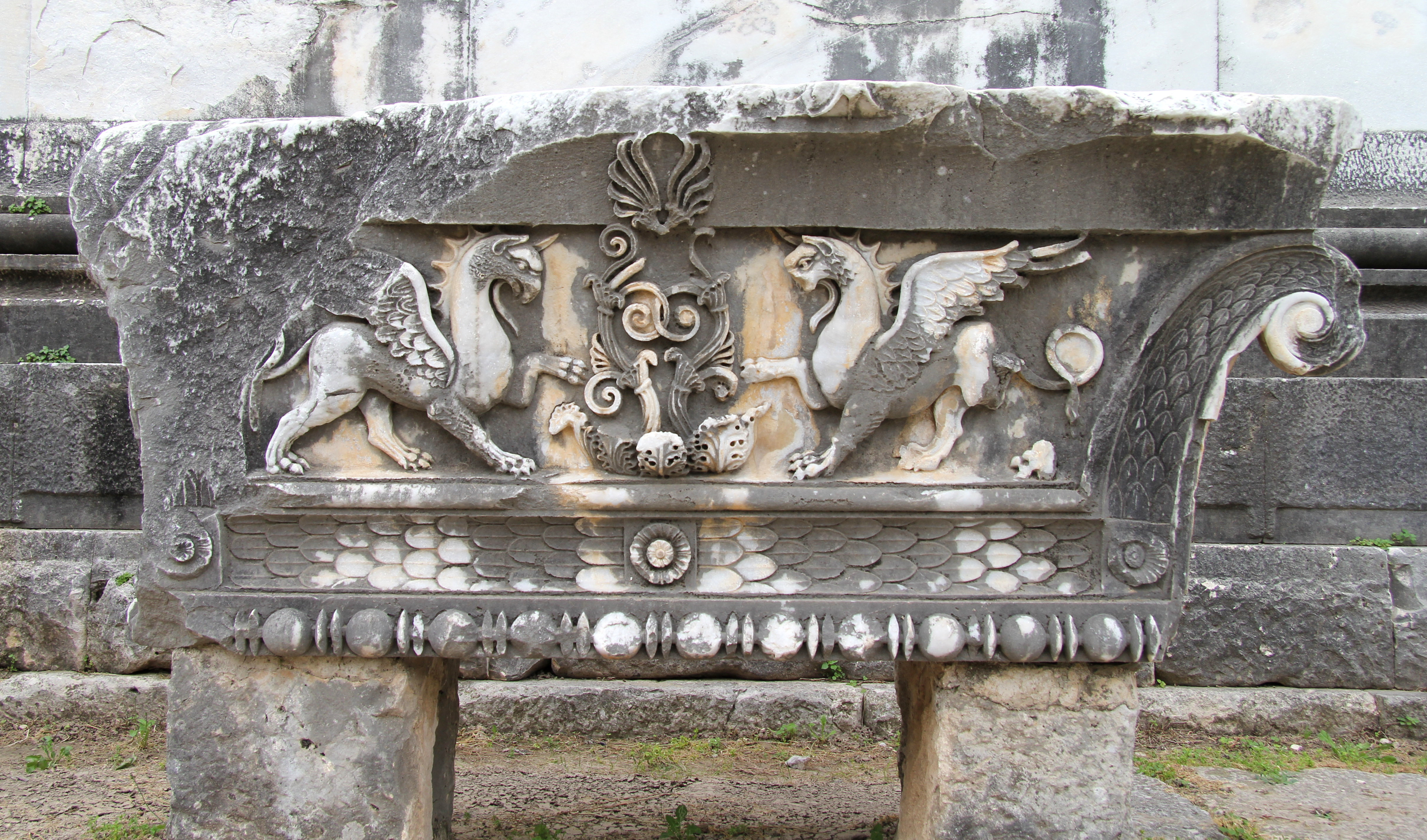
Ancient Greek bead and reel on the base of a capital from the ruins of the Temple of Apollo at Didyma, Turkey, unknown architect or sculptor, c. 300–150 BC

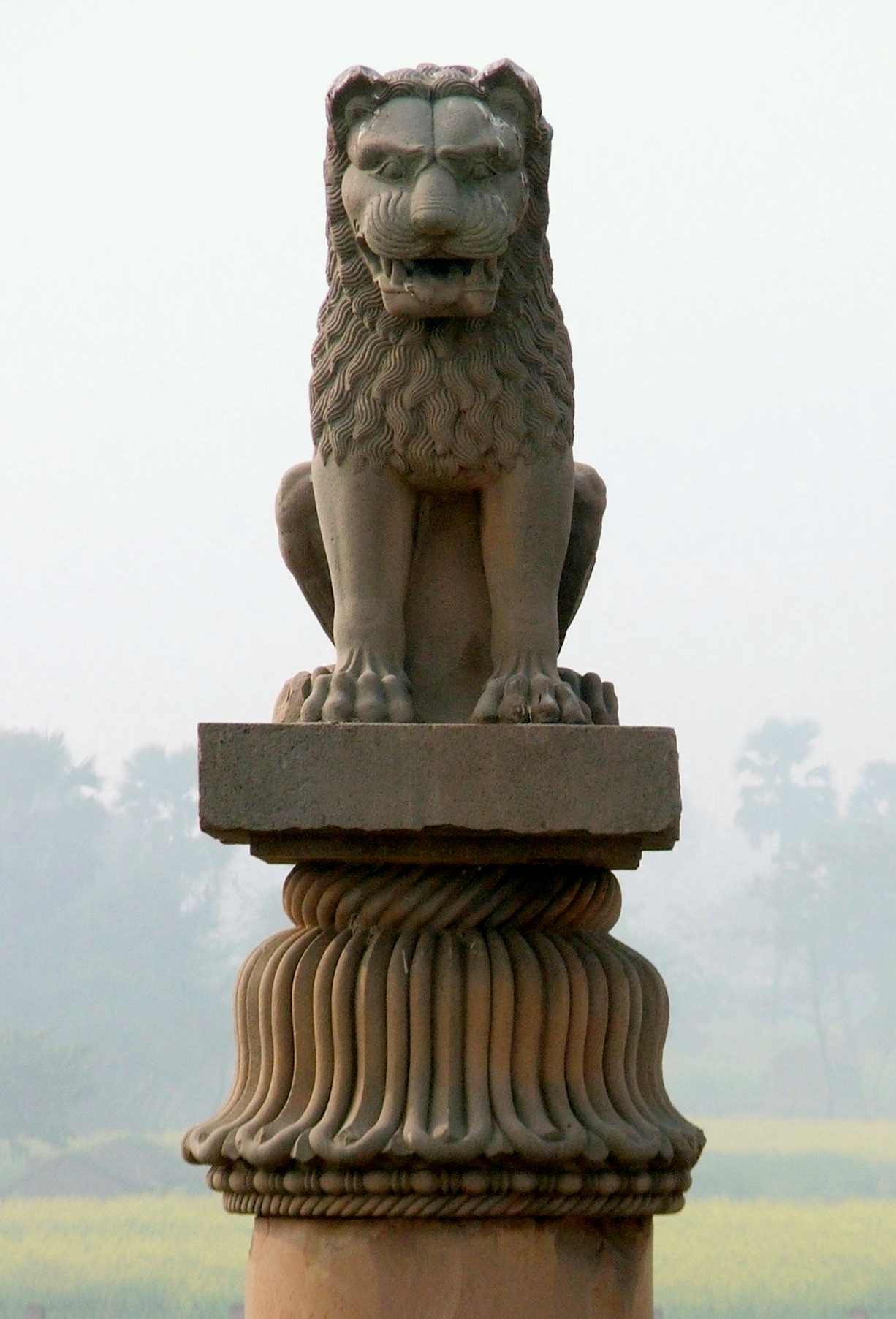
Bead and reel at the base of the capital of a Pillar of Ashoka, in Vaishali, India, unknown architect or sculptor, 3rd century BC

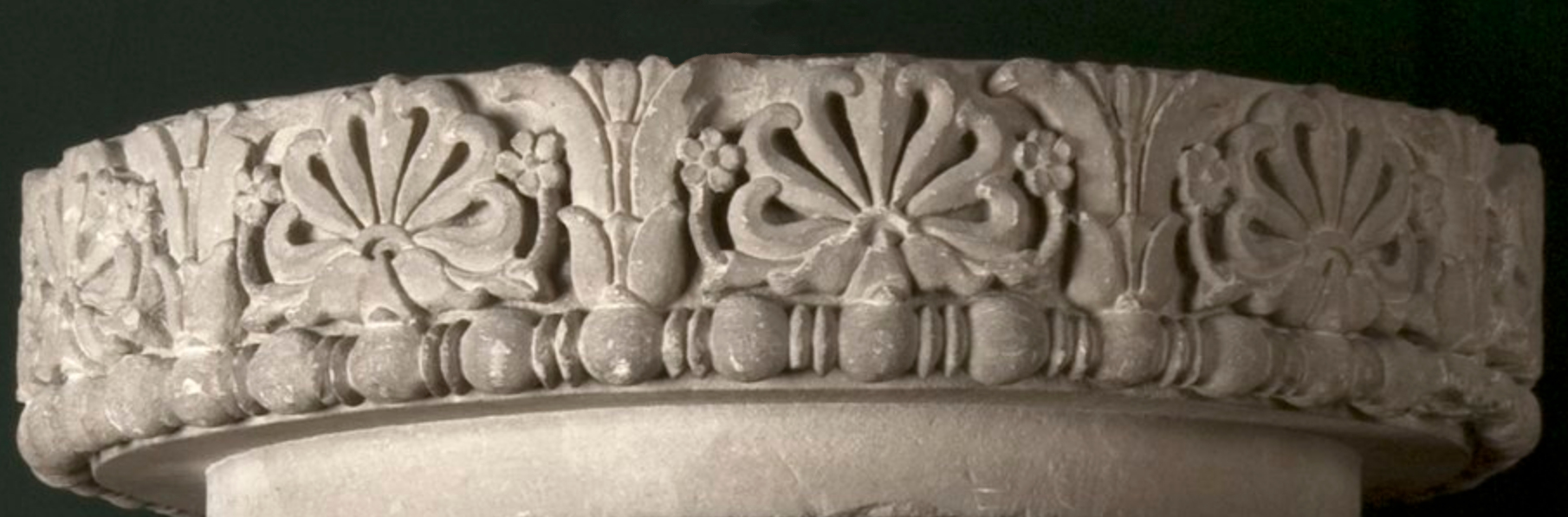
Frieze of the lost capital of the Allahabad pillar, with two lotuses framing a "flame palmette" surrounded by small rosette flowers, over a band of bead and reel, 3rd century BC, unknown material, Allahabad Museum, Prayagraj, India

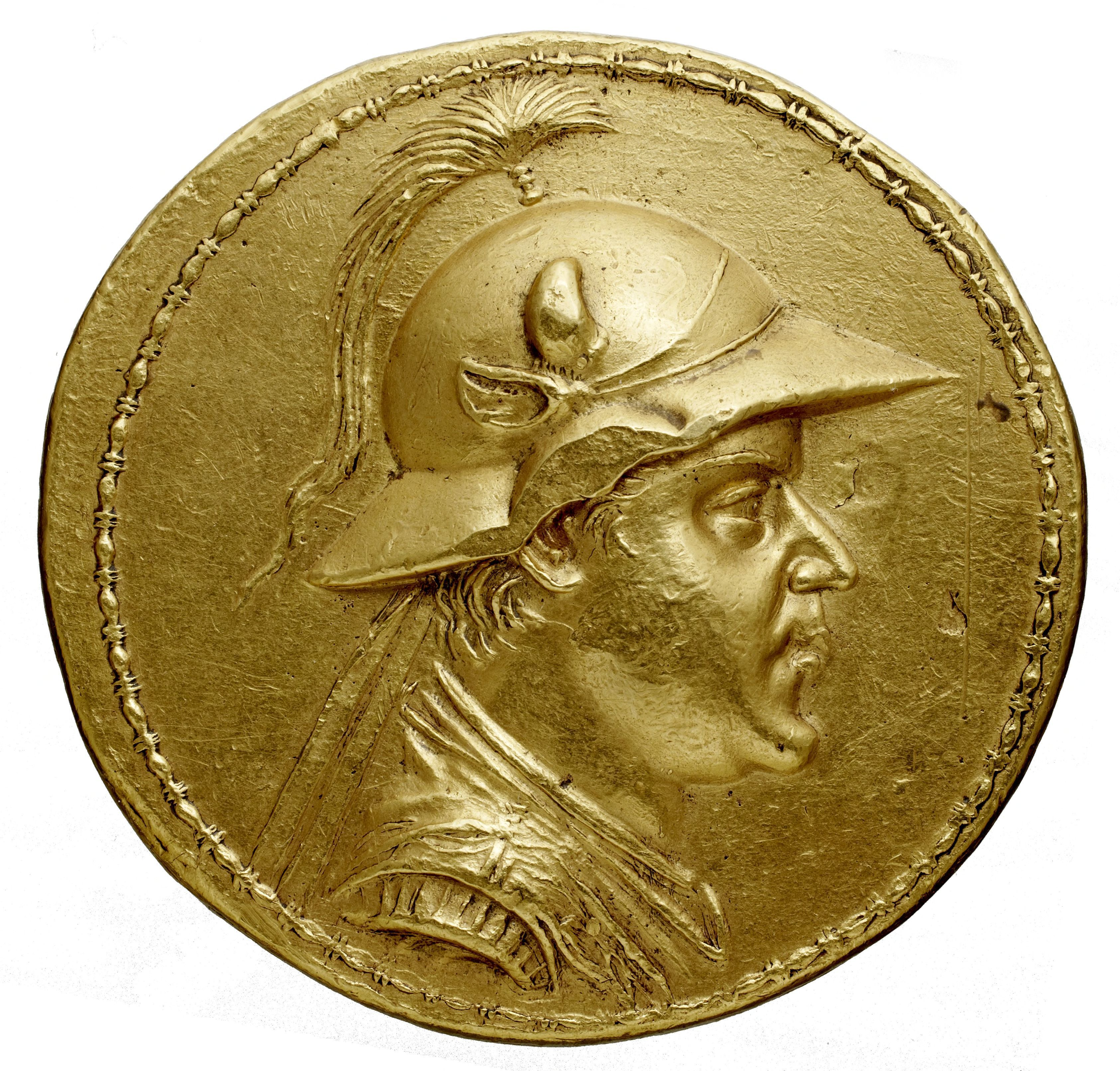
Gold 20-stater of Eucratides I within a bead and reel border, 2nd century BC, Cabinet des Médailles, Paris

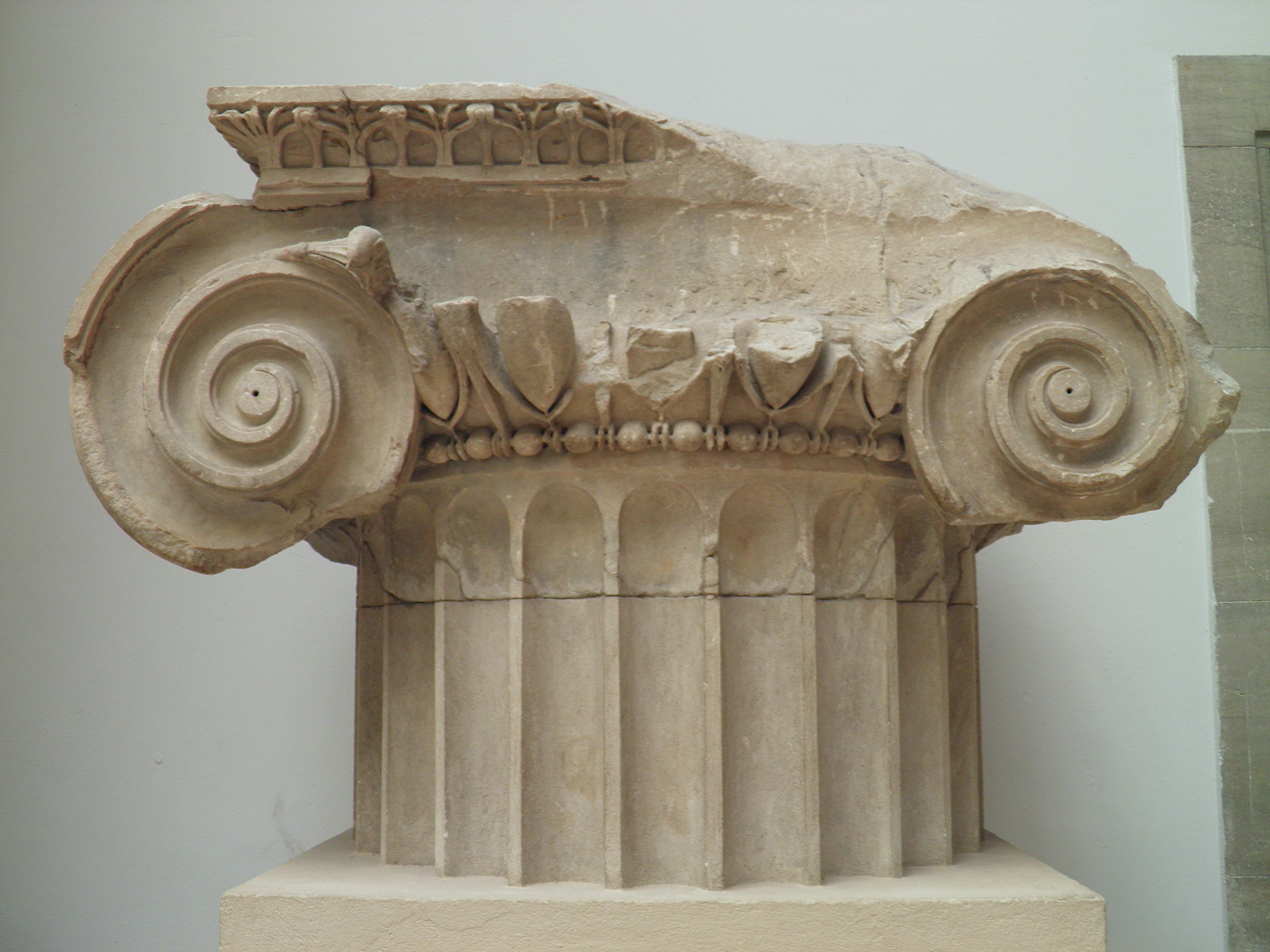
Ancient Greek Ionic capital with bead and reel, from the Temple of Artemis Leukophryene at Magnesia on the Maeander, 2nd century BC, unknown type of stone, Pergamon Museum, Berlin

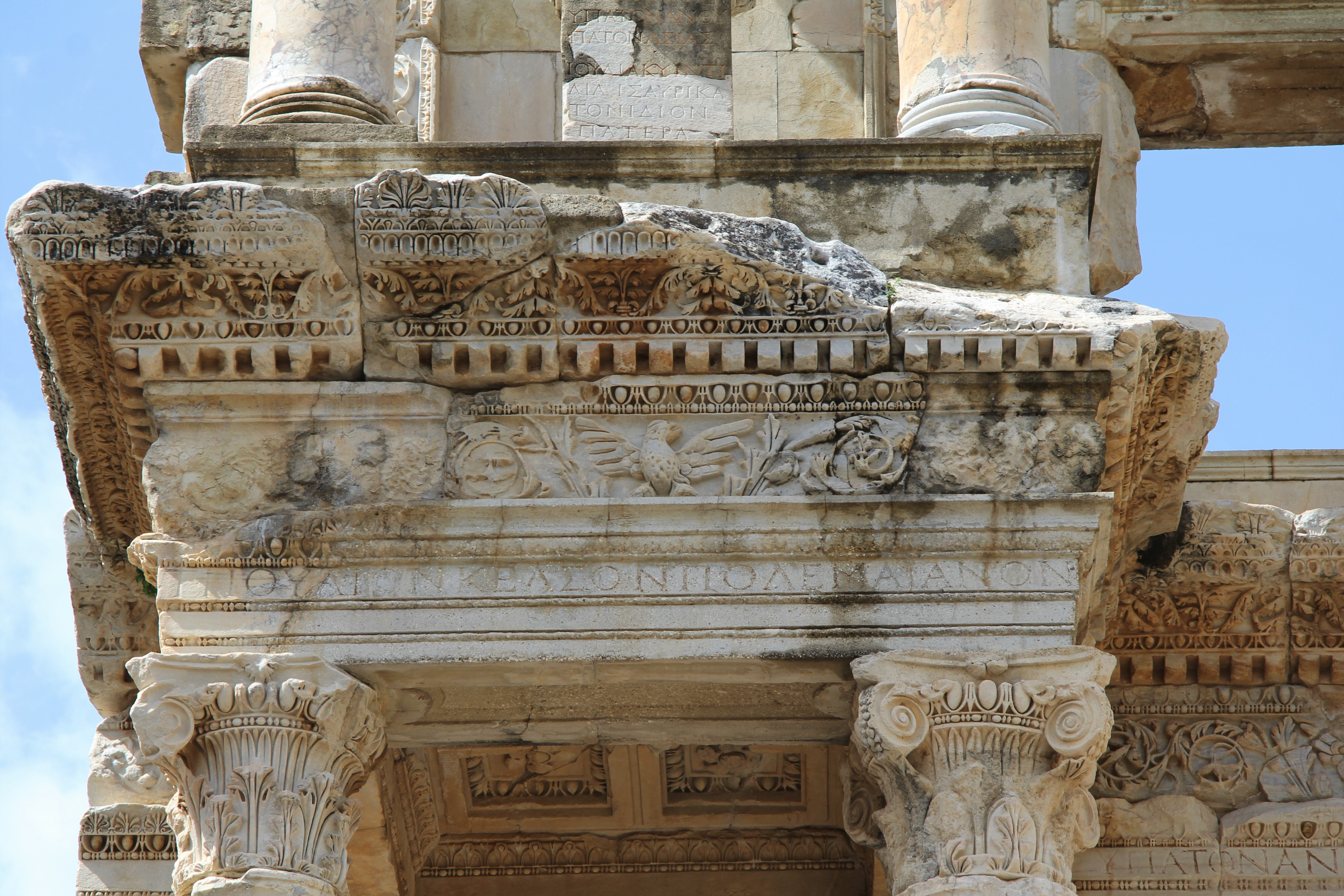
Roman Composite capitals with bead and reel of the Library of Celsus, Ephesus, Turkey, unknown architect, c.110AD

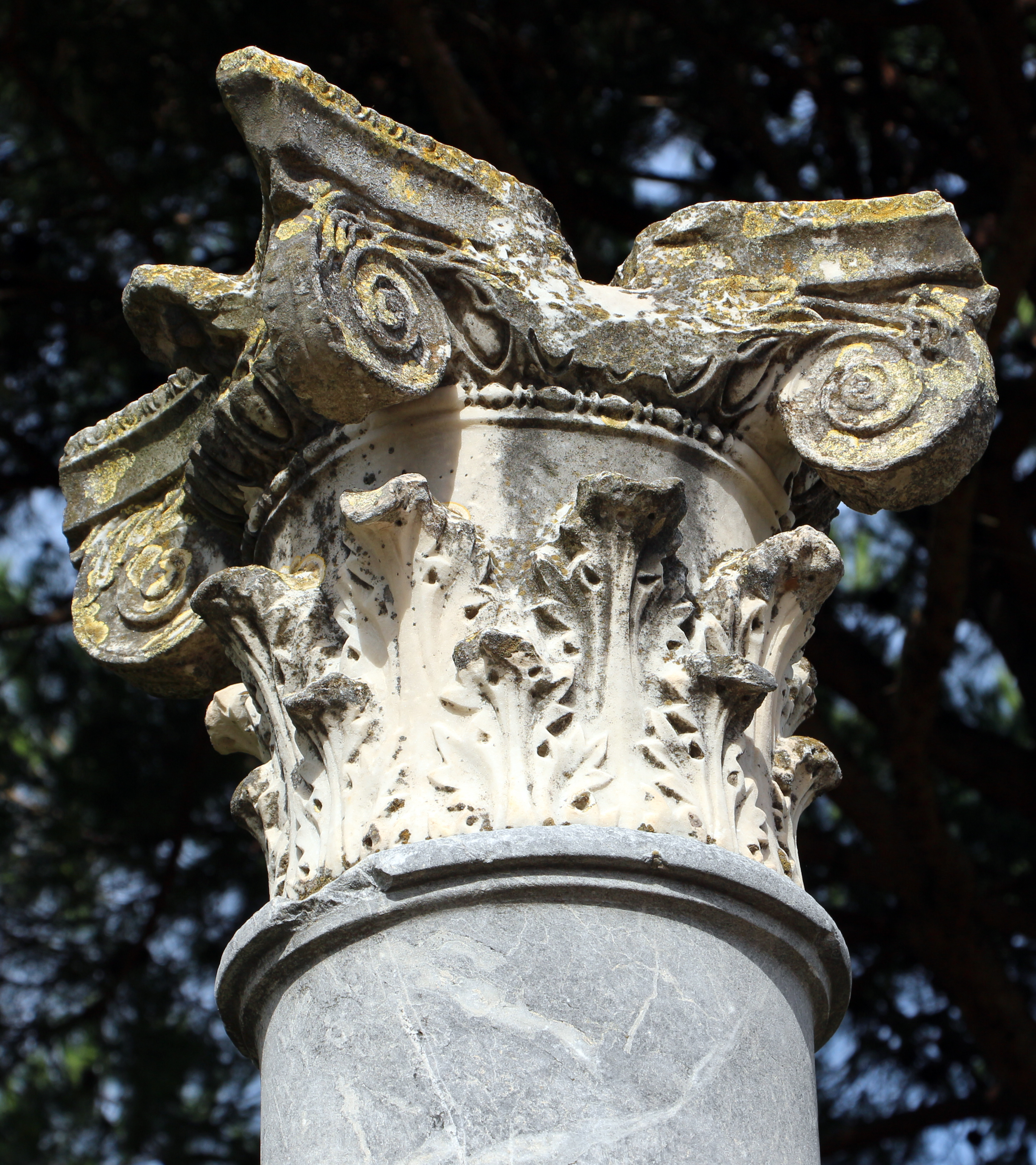
Roman Composite capital with bead and reel of the Ancient Theatre of Ostia Antica, near modern Ostia, southwest of Rome, unknown architect, late 2nd century

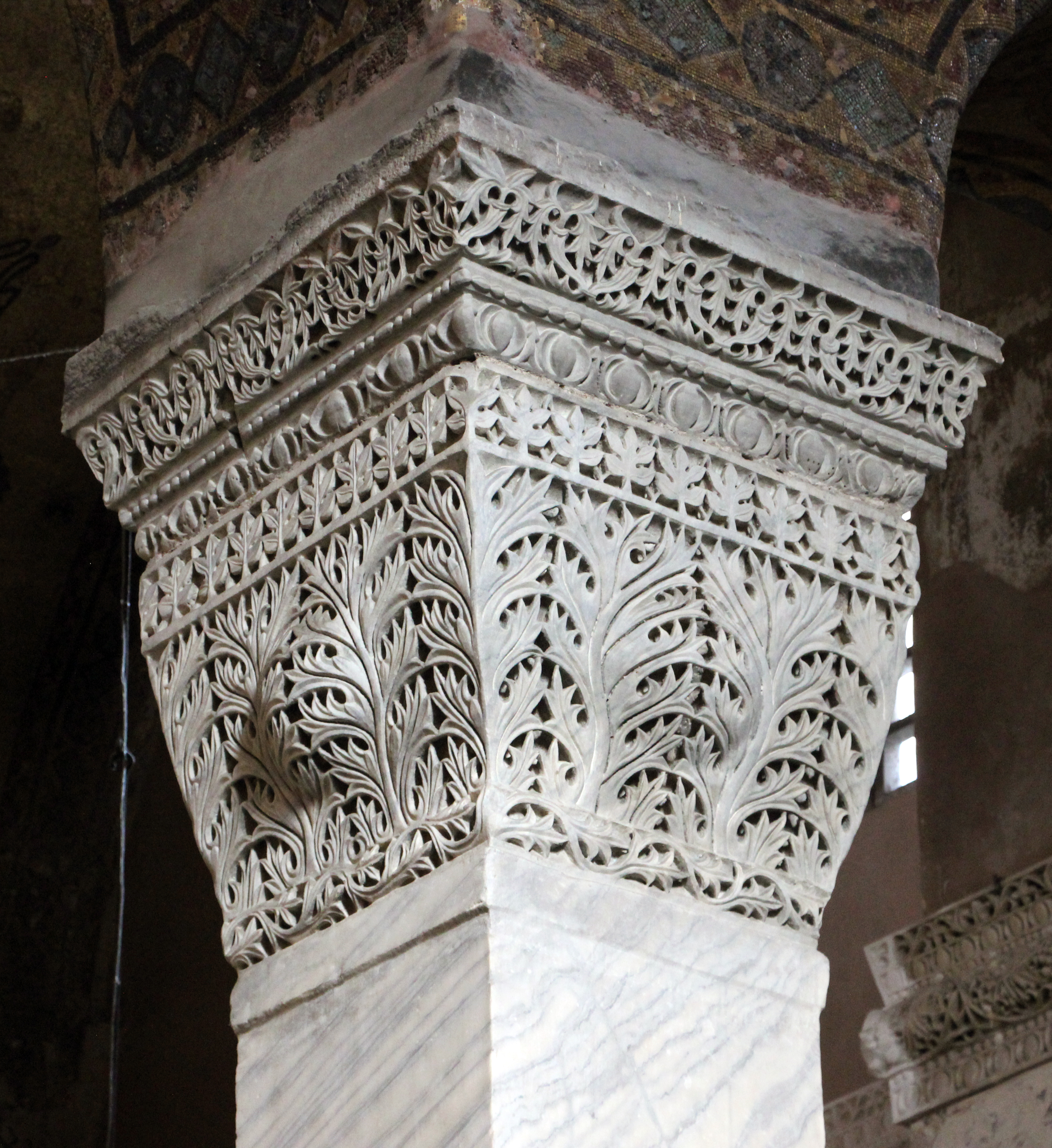
Byzantine bead-and-reel on a basket capital in the Hagia Sophia, Istanbul, Turkey, by Anthemius of Tralles or Isidore of Miletus, 6th century

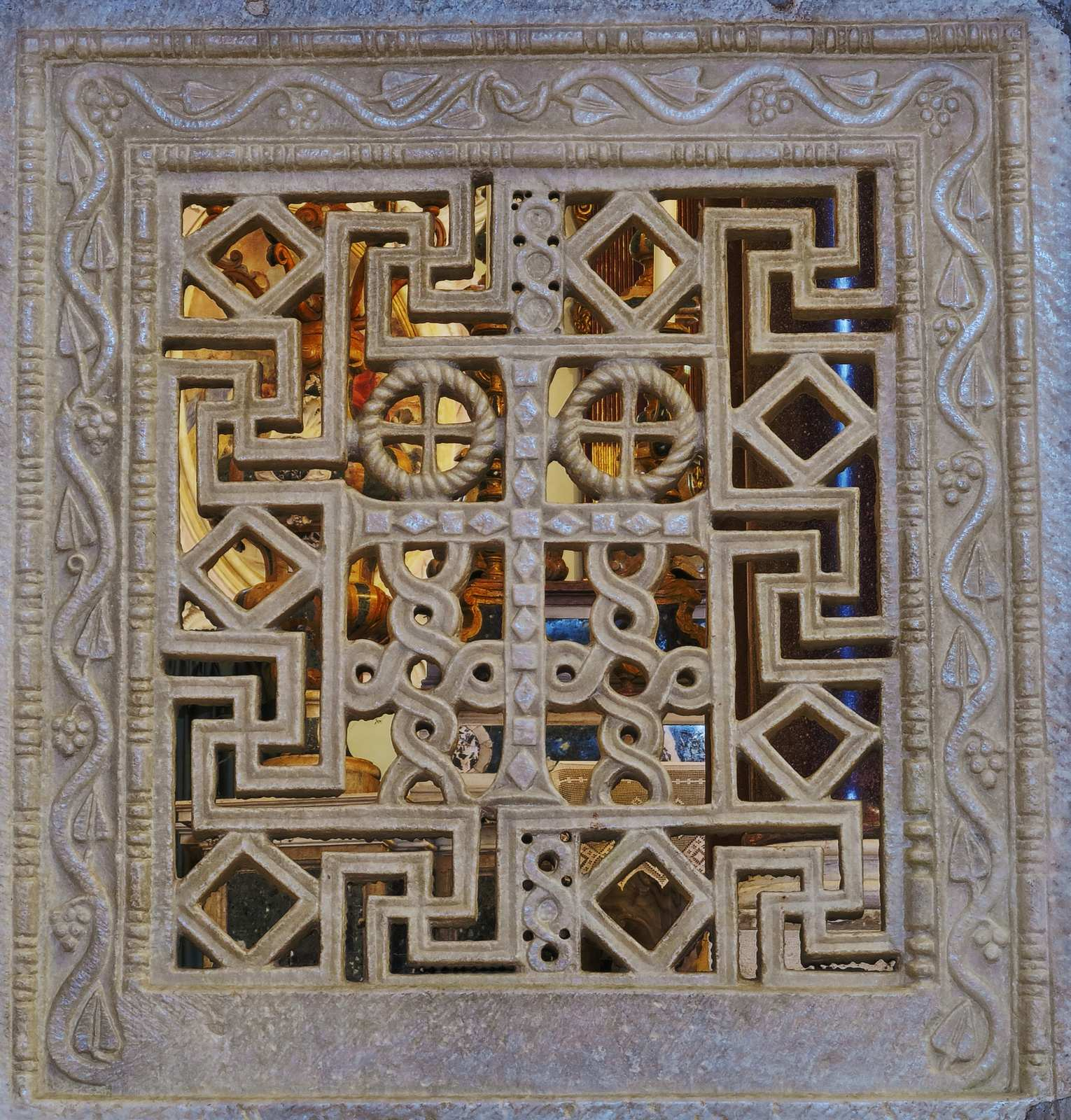
Byzantine bead-and-reel on the boarder of a pierced marble panel from the Basilica of Sant'Apollinare Nuovo, Ravenna, Italy, unknown architect or sculptor, 6th century

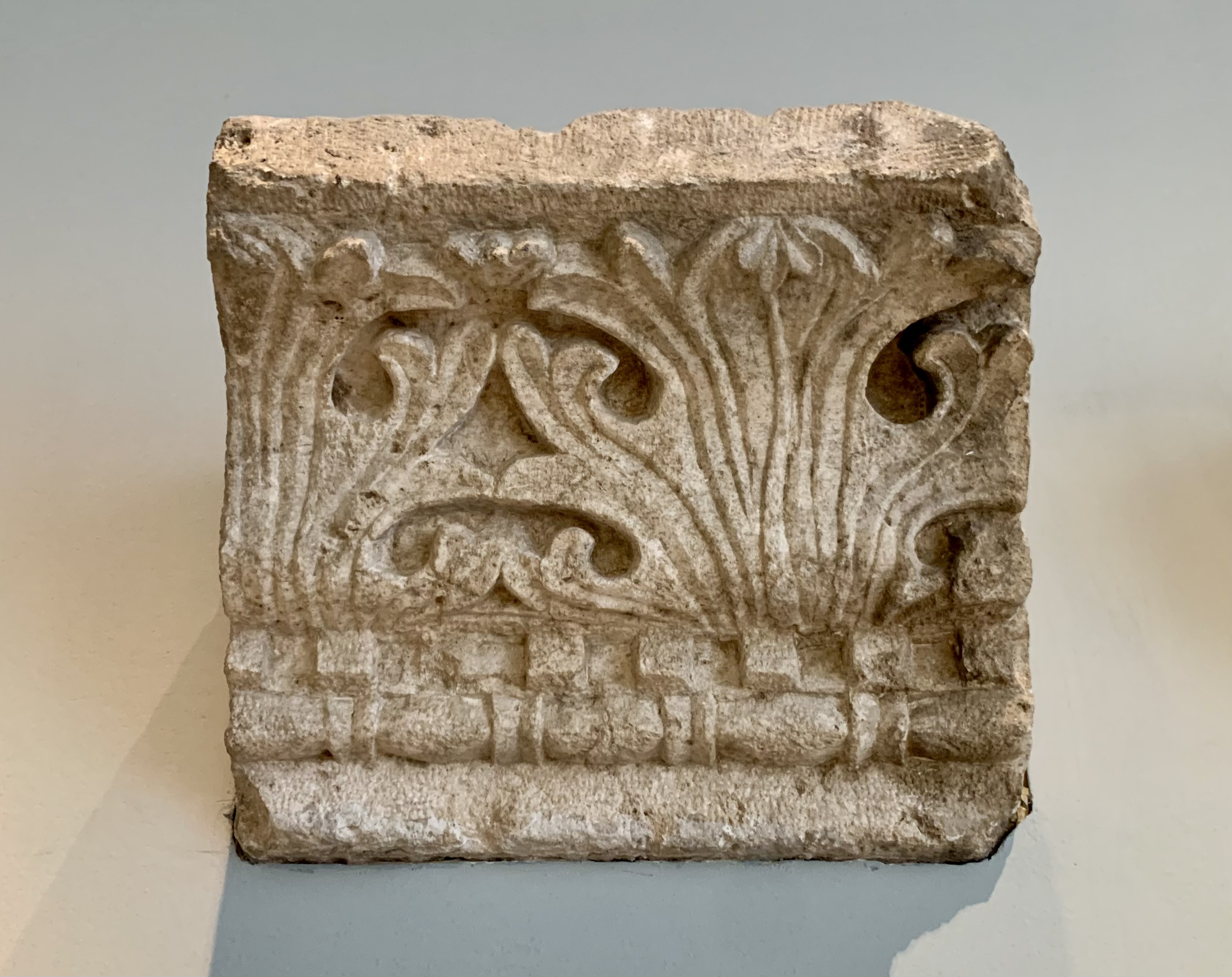
Islamic bead and reel on a cornice, c.705-715, limestone, Pergamon Museum

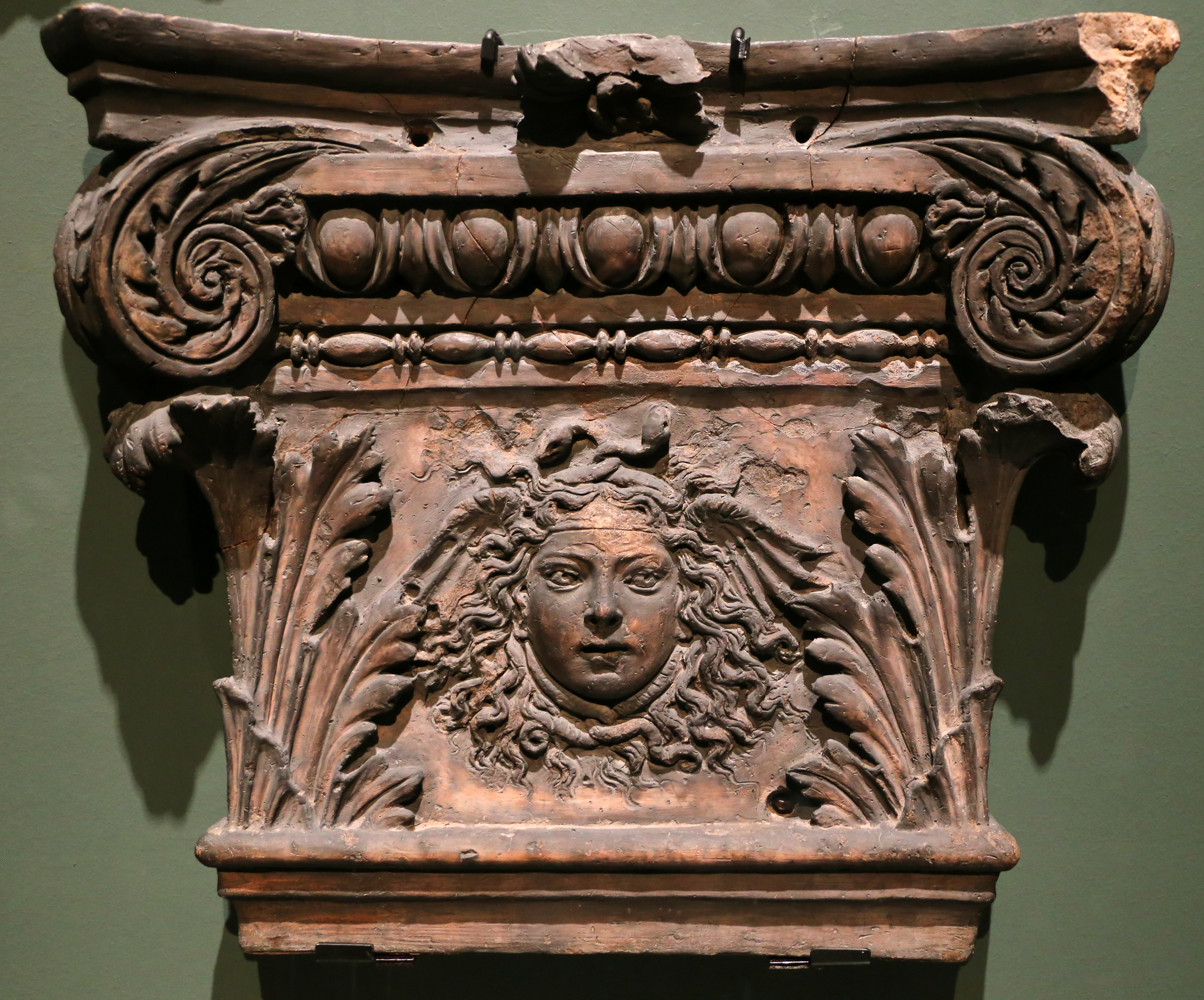
Renaissance Composite pilaster capital with bead and reel and a gorgon mascaron, by a Florentine pupil of Verrocchio active in Rome, perhaps Michele Marini da Fiesole, c.1485-1495, terracotta, Museo di Roma, Rome

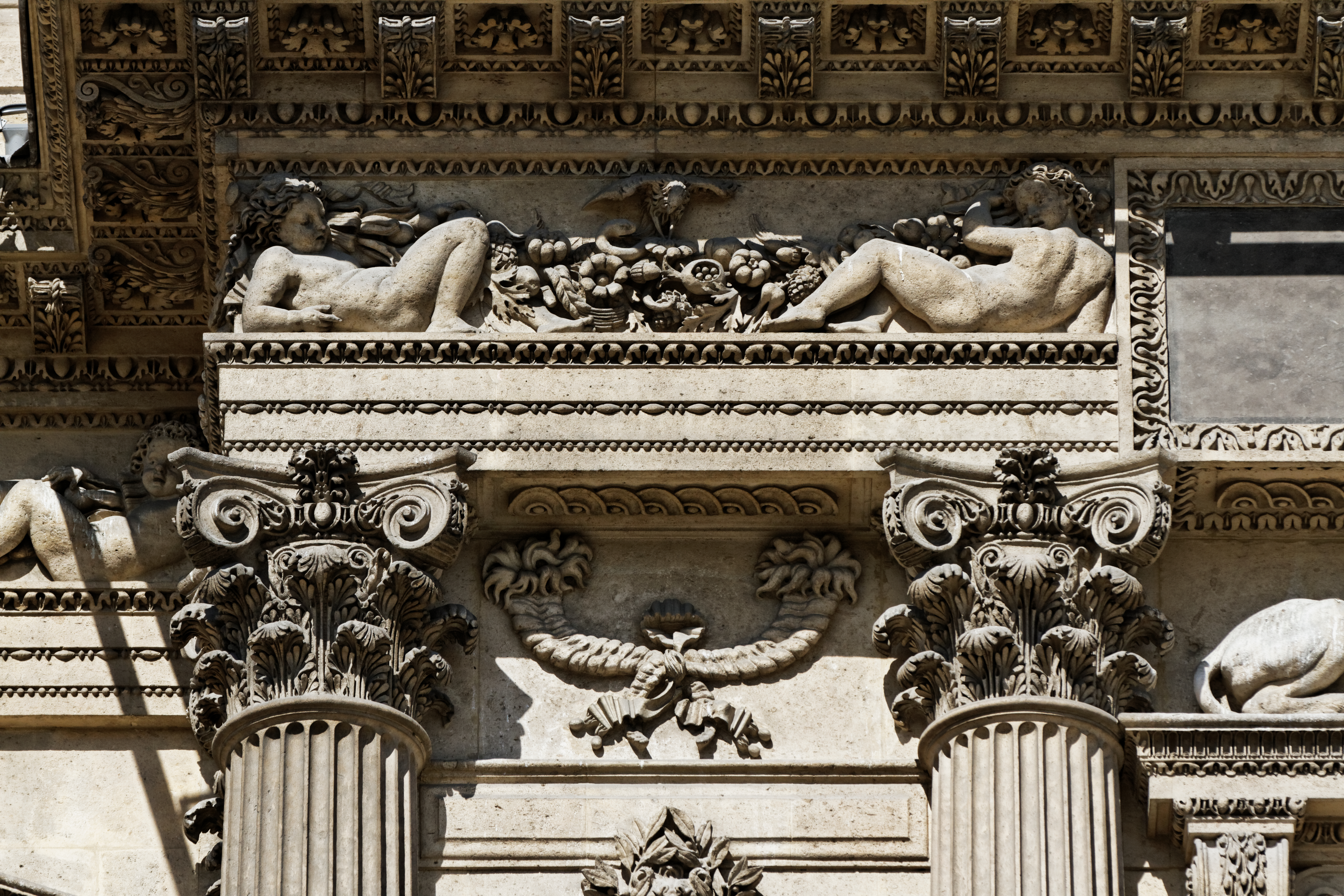
Renaissance entablature with bead and reel of the Lescot Wing of the Louvre Palace, Paris, by Pierre Lescot, 1546-1551

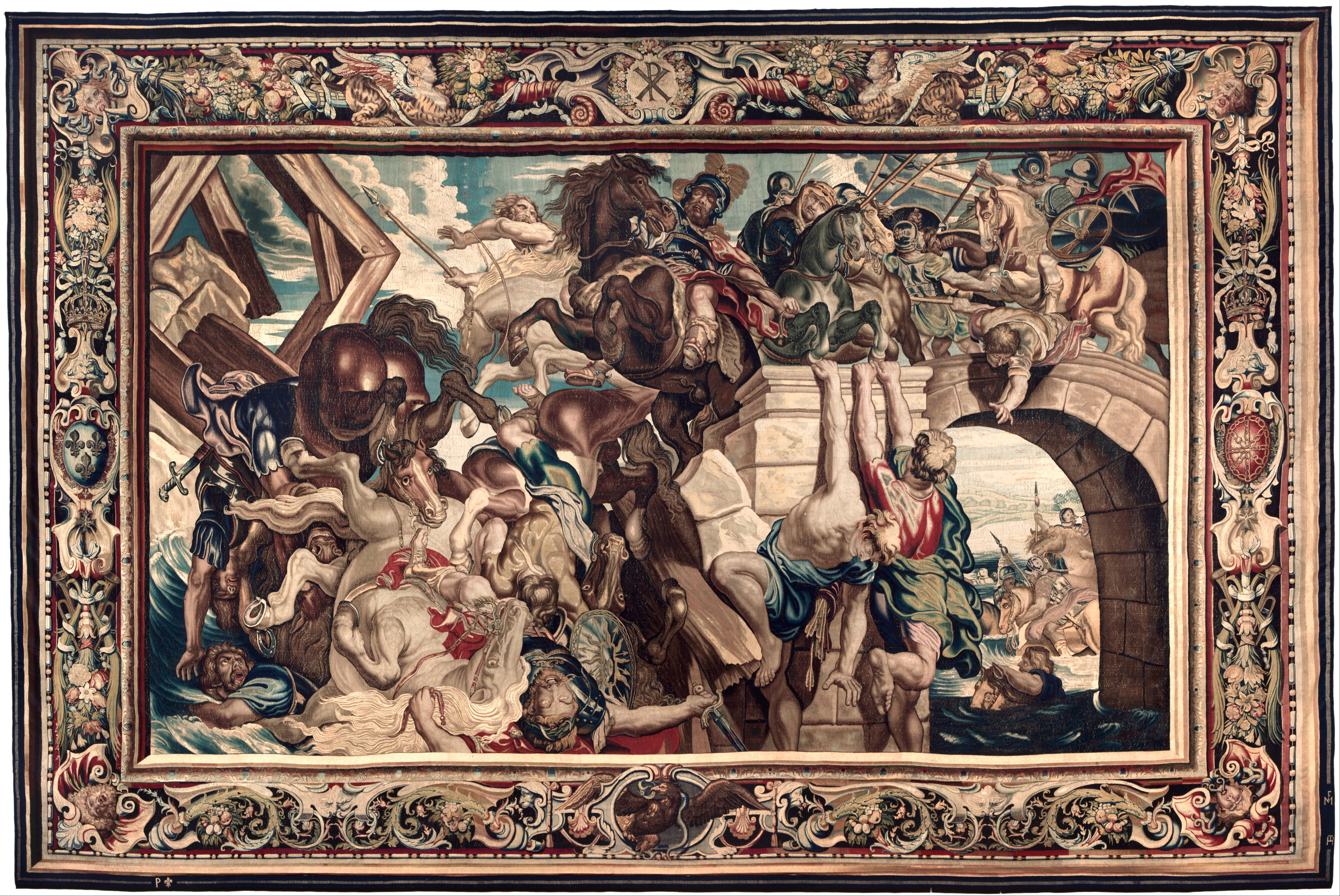
Baroque bead and reel on a tapestry showing the Triumph of Constantine over Maxentius at the Battle of the Milvian Bridge, designed by Peter Paul Rubens in 1622, produced from 1623 until 1625, wool and silk with gold and silver threads, Philadelphia Museum of Art, Philadelphia, US

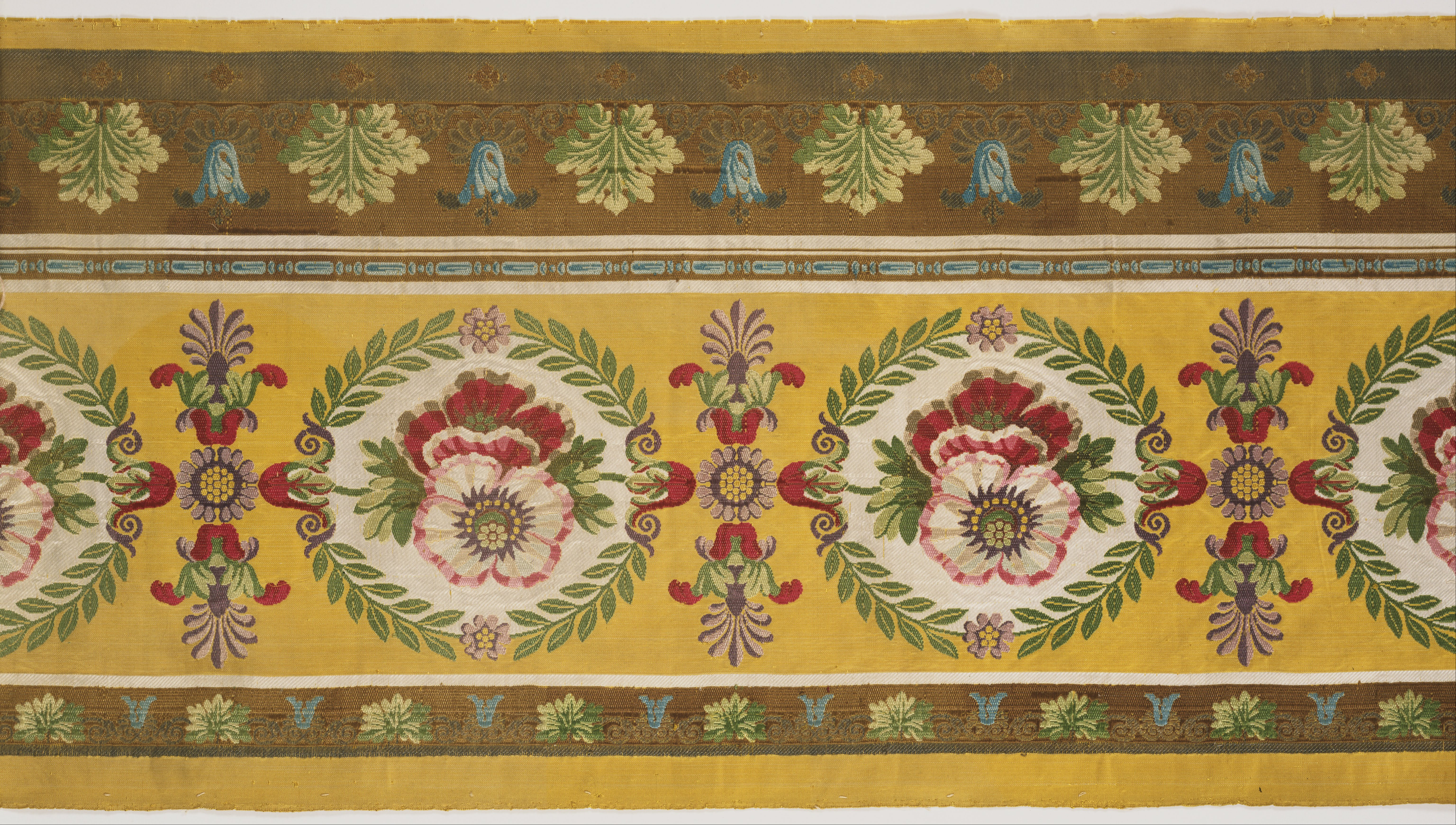
Neoclassical bead and reel on a piece of textile, by Séquin & Co. fro, Lyon, 1811, silk plain weave with silk brocading wefts, Philadelphia Museum of Art

Greek Revival Ionic capital with bead and reel, at the main entrance of the Academy of Athens, Athens, Greece, 1885

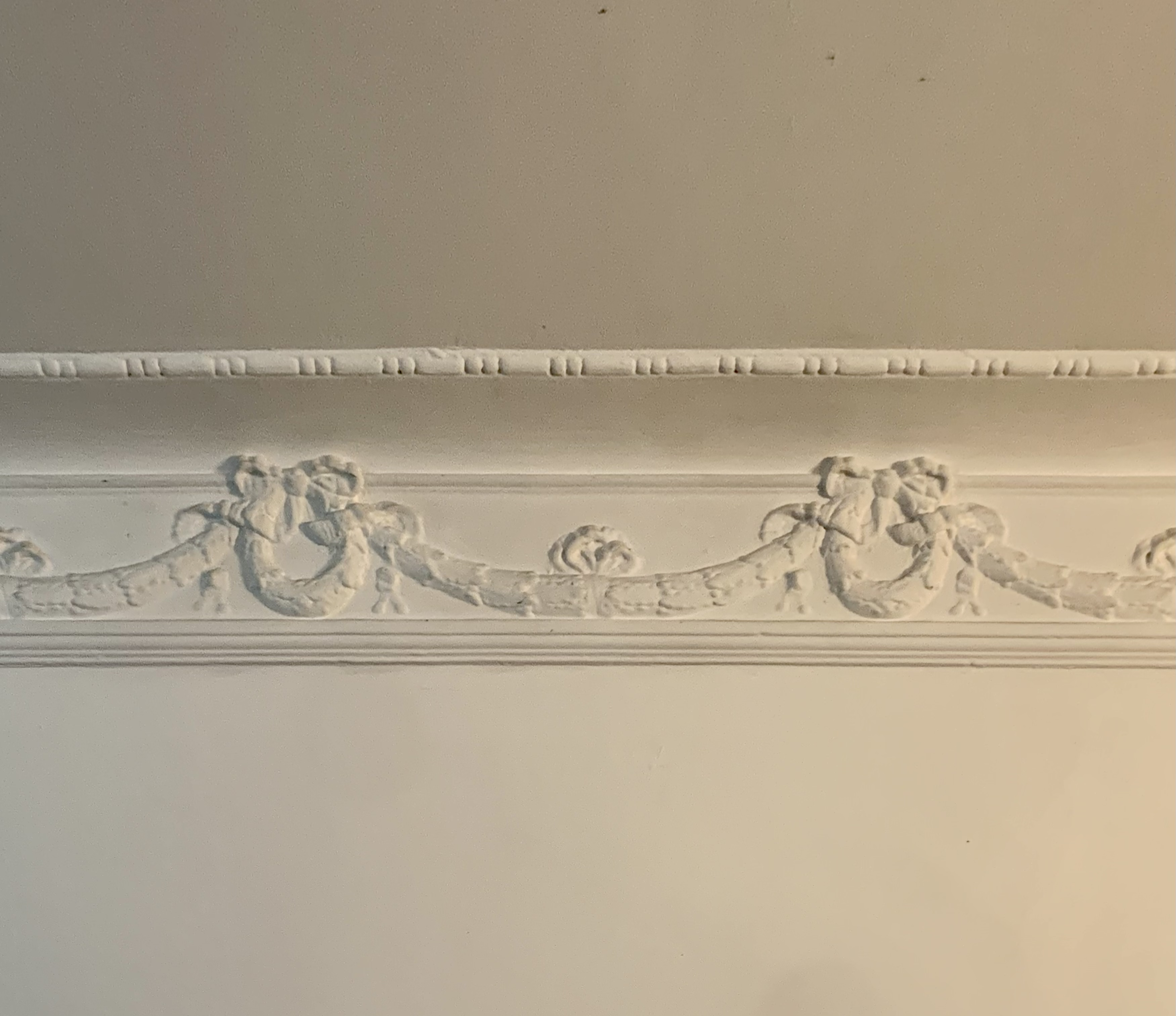
Art Nouveau frieze with festoons, bordered at the top by a bead and reel strip, in Calea Dorobanților no. 50A, Bucharest, Romania, unknown architect or sculptor, c. 1900

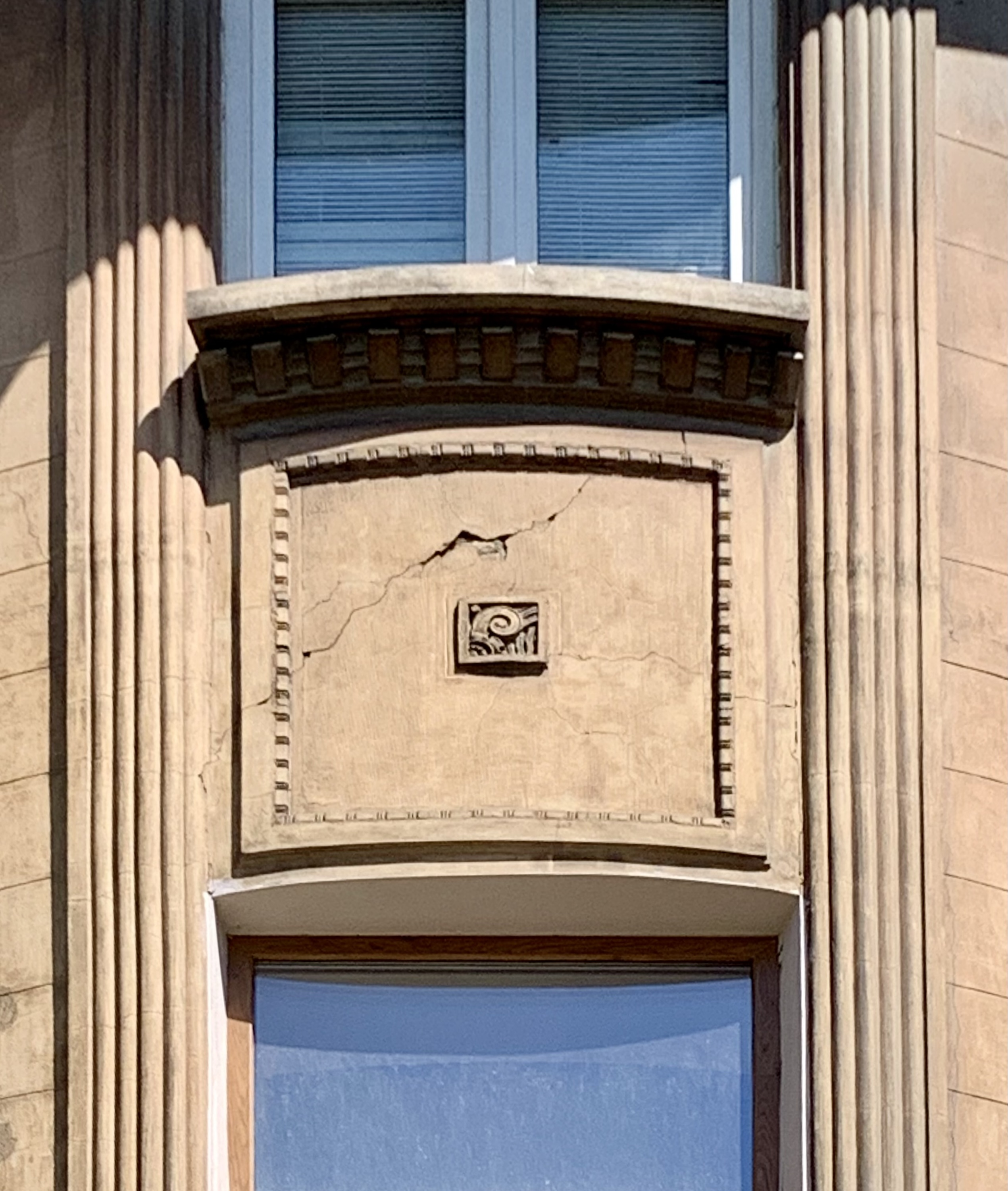
Art Deco bead and reel on Piața Mihail Kogălniceanu no. 1, Bucharest, unknown architect or sculptor, c.1930

== See also ==
- Pearl circle
