= Jean-Pierre Droz =

Swiss-born coin and medal engraver trained in Neuchâtel

Jean-Pierre Droz (1746 - 1823) was a swiss coin and medal engraver, born in Switzerland and trained in the Principality of Neuchâtel. Droz was most known for engraving the Napoléon coin at the Paris Mint.

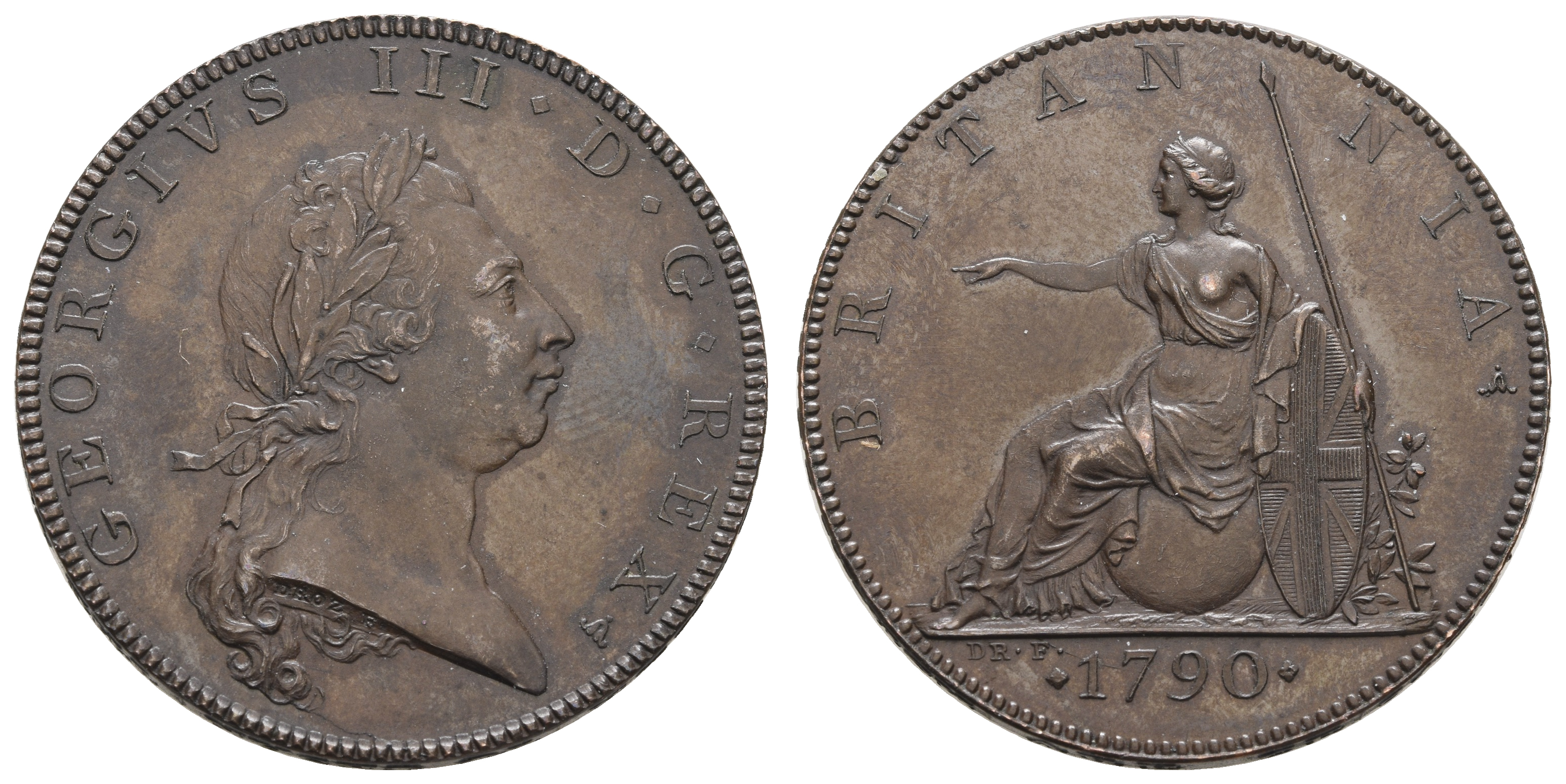
Cu-Pattern Halfpenny George III by Jean-Pierre Droz, struck in 1790 at Matthew Boulton's Soho Mint, with raised edge inscription: RENDER TO CESAR THE THINGS WHICH ARE CESARS

He was employed by the prominent English manufacturer and business man, Matthew Boulton (1728 - 1809) to improve Boulton's coin and medal quality. However, he worked there for just two years. In 1789, Droz devised a collar used to engrave the sides of coins and ensure a circular shape, and though it was unsuitable for large numbers of coins, it remained in use at the Soho Mint.

He was a member of the Royal Birmingham Society of Artists.
