= Scissel =

Scissel is the scrap produced in the punching of coin blanks from a continuous strip of metal. The scrap is collected and remelted to form new sheets, or may be melted for manufacture of other alloys.

== See also ==
- Sissel Norwegian female given name
- Sisal fibrous plant
