= Coin edge =

Textured edge of a coin, sometimes lettered

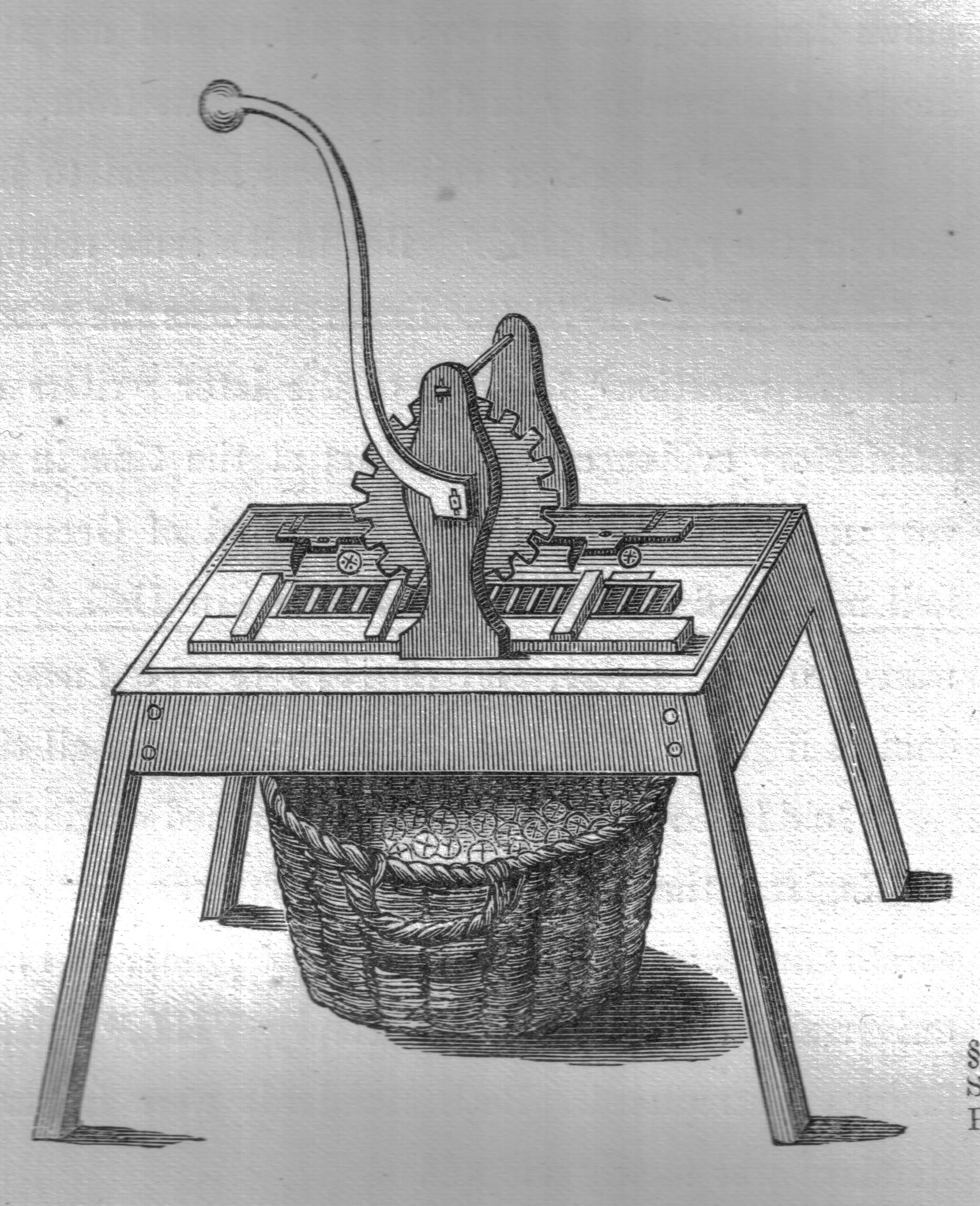
Coin edge inscription mill

Coin edges are the parts of a coin's surface between the faces; they may be plain (smooth) or patterned, or a combination of both. They can also include lettering.

Reeded edges are often referred to as "ridged" or "grooved" (US usage), or "milled" (UK usage). Some coins, such as United States quarters and dimes, have reeded edges. Reeding of edges was introduced to prevent coin clipping and counterfeiting.

The main techniques of coin edging are edge mills of various types, which put a pattern on a smooth edge, after a coin and coin mills with edge rings, which pattern the edge at the time when the coin is being milled.

== Inscriptions ==
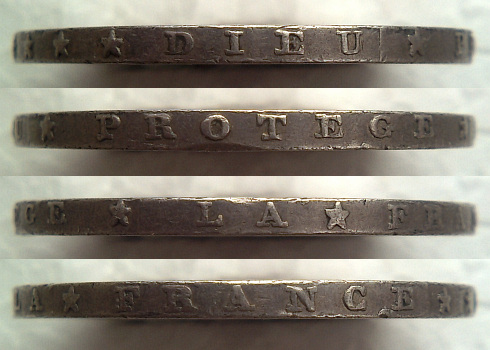
Dieu★ protège★la★France★★★ "God protect France" on the edge of 1873 five-franc coins

Examples of edge inscriptions or edge lettering include e pluribus unum on the edge of U.S. Presidential dollar coins, various national €2 edge inscriptions, and various phrases on the UK one pound coin, most commonly decus et tutamen. Inscriptions are more common on thicker, higher-value, or non-circulating coins.

== See also ==
- Pearl circle on coins
