= 1933 double eagle =

Twenty-dollar American gold coin minted in 1933

Double eagle ($20.00)
- United States
- Value: $20.00 (Face Value) U.S. dollars
- Mass: 33.431 g
- Diameter: 34.1 mm (1.34252 in)
- Thickness: 2.41 mm (0.09488 in)
- Edge: Lettered – E Pluribus Unum
- Composition: 90% gold, 10% copper
- Years of minting: 1933

Obverse
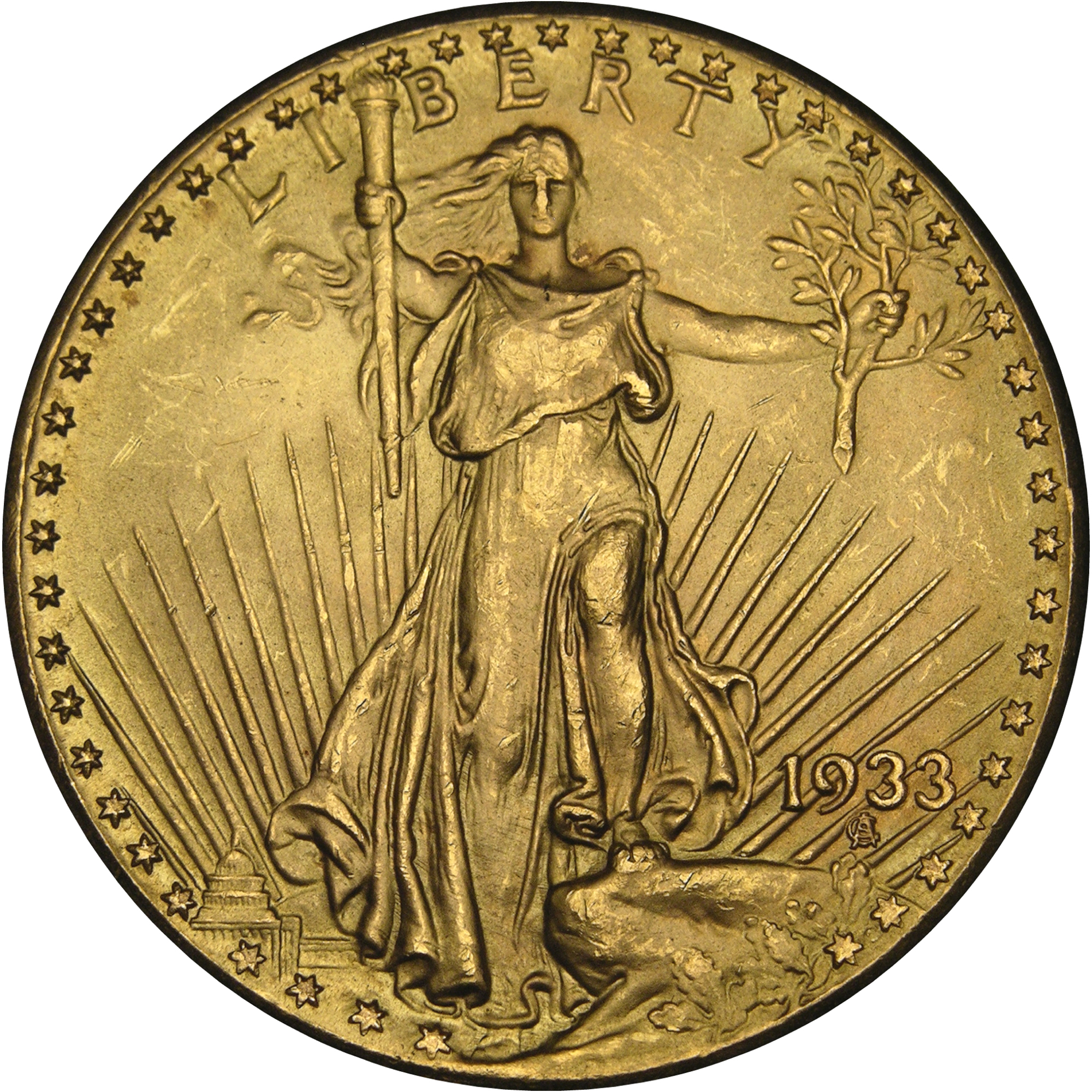
- Design: Liberty holding a torch and olive branch, backed by the rays of the Sun, the U.S. Capitol visible; 48 stars circle design
- Designer: Augustus Saint-Gaudens
- Design date: 1907

Reverse
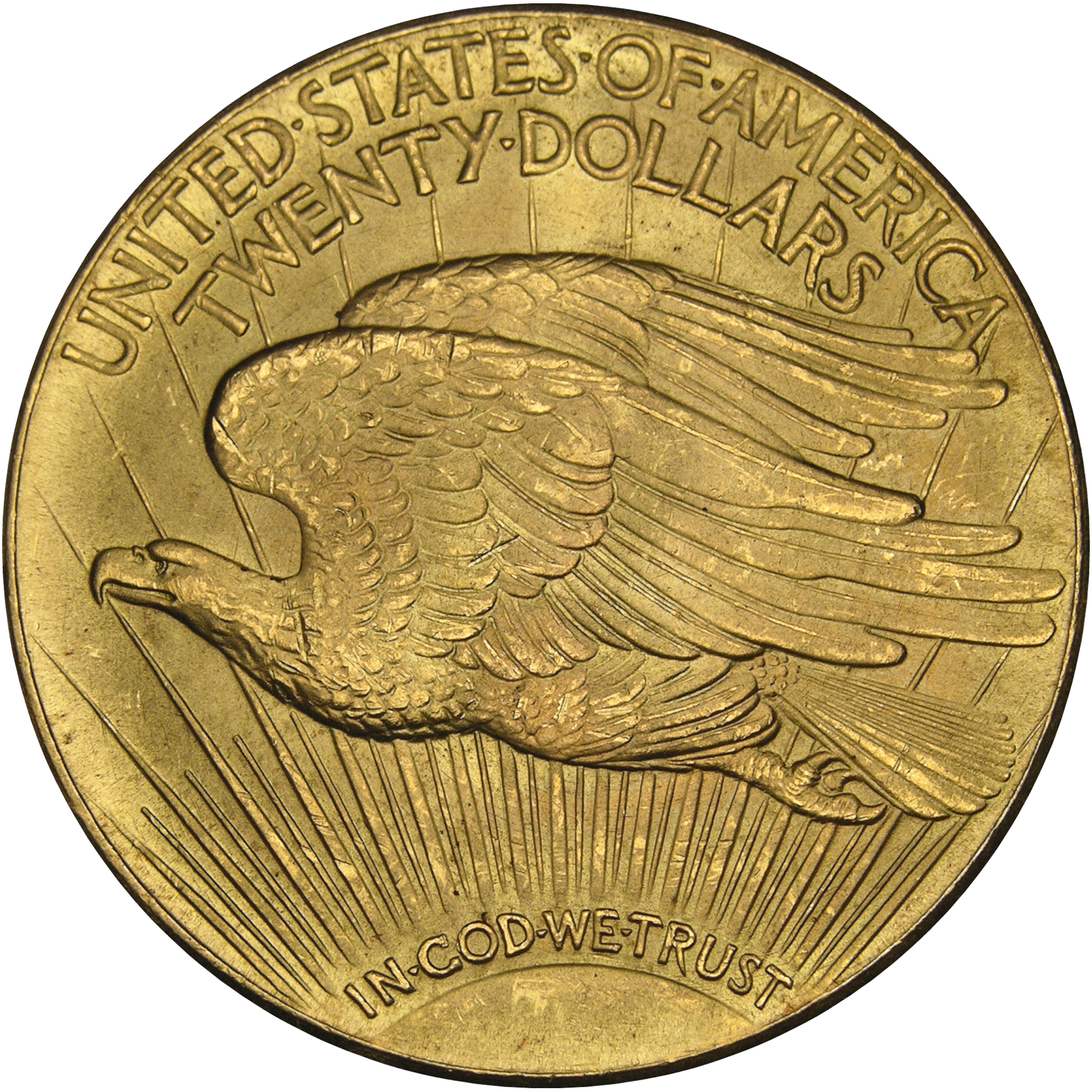
- Design: Bald eagle in flight, backed by rays from the Sun, with motto
- Designer: Augustus Saint-Gaudens
- Design date: 1907

The 1933 double eagle is a United States 20-dollar gold coin. Although 445,500 specimens of this Saint-Gaudens double eagle were minted in 1933 in the midst of the Great Depression, none were officially circulated; further, all but two were ordered to be melted down. However, 20 more are known to have been stolen prior to their destruction and found their way into the hands of collectors before later being recovered. Nine of the recovered coins were destroyed, making this one of the world's rarest coins, with only 13 known specimens remaining—only one of which is privately owned, which is known as the Weitzman Specimen. Because the coin was never released to the public, it is illegal to privately own any of the 1933 double eagles, with the exception of the Weitzman Specimen. The United States Secret Service is said to investigate reports of the existence of other specimens that come to light.

The two intentionally spared coins are in the U.S. National Numismatic Collection, ten others are held in the United States Bullion Depository at Fort Knox, and the one remaining recovered coin was sold in 2002 to private collector Stuart Weitzman (who remained anonymous at the time) for US$7.59 million (equivalent to $12.2 million as of 2022)—the second-highest price paid at auction for a single U.S. coin. The coin sold again to an anonymous buyer at auction in June 2021 for US$18.9 million, making it the most expensive coin ever sold.

== Production ==
In 1933, in an attempt to end the 1930s general bank crisis, U.S. president Franklin D. Roosevelt issued Executive Order 6102, which provisions included:

Section 2. All persons are hereby required to deliver on or before May 1, 1933, to a Federal Reserve bank or a branch or agency thereof or to any member bank of the Federal Reserve System all gold coin, gold bullion, and gold certificates now owned by them or coming into their ownership on or before April 28, 1933, with the exception of the following:

(a) Such amount of gold as may be required for legitimate and customary use in industry, profession or art within a reasonable time, including gold prior to refining and stocks of gold in reasonable amounts for the usual trade requirements of owners mining and refining such gold.
(b) Gold coin and gold certificates in an amount not exceeding in the aggregate $100.00 belonging to any one person; and gold coins having recognized special value to collectors of rare and unusual coins.
(c) Gold coin and bullion earmarked or held in trust for a recognized foreign government or foreign central bank or the Bank for International Settlements.
(d) Gold coin and bullion licensed for the other proper transactions (not involving hoarding) including gold coin and gold bullion imported for the re-export or held pending action on applications for export license.

Congress additionally passed the Gold Reserve Act in 1934, which outlawed the circulation and private possession of United States gold coins for general circulation, with an exemption for collector coins. This act declared that gold coins were no longer legal tender in the United States, and people had to turn in their gold coins for other forms of currency. The 1933 gold double eagles were struck after this executive order, but because they were no longer legal tender, most of the 1933 gold coins were melted down in late 1934 and some were destroyed in tests. Two of the $20 double eagles were presented by the United States Mint to the U.S. National Numismatic Collection, and one is currently on display in the National Museum of American History, in The Value of Money exhibit.

These three coins should have been the only 1933 double eagle coins in existence. However, unknown to the mint, a number of the coins (20 have been recovered so far) were stolen, possibly by the U.S. Mint cashier, and found their way via Philadelphia jeweler Israel Switt into the hands of collectors. The coins circulated among collectors for several years before the Secret Service became aware of their existence. The matter came to the attention of mint officials when an investigative reporter looked into the history of the coins he had spotted in an upcoming Stack's Bowers coin auction and contacted the Mint as part of his research. As a result, an official investigation into the matter was launched by the Secret Service in March 1944. Prior to the investigation, a Texas dealer sold one of the coins to a foreign buyer, and it left the U.S. on February 29, 1944.

During the first year of the investigation, seven coins were seized or voluntarily turned in to the Secret Service and were subsequently destroyed at the Mint; an eighth coin was recovered the following year and met the same fate. In 1945, the investigation identified the alleged thief and his accomplice, Switt, who admitted to selling the nine (located) coins, but said he could not recall how he obtained them. The Justice Department tried to prosecute them, but the statute of limitations had passed. The ninth coin was recovered and destroyed in 1952.

In contrast, the 1933 Eagle was issued before Roosevelt's withdrawal order, so they may be legally owned by private citizens. However, it is estimated that no more than 40 exist, the rest having been melted, making them exceptionally rare.

== Farouk specimen ==
=== 1944 export and subsequent disappearance ===
The coin sold by the Texas dealer was acquired by King Farouk of Egypt, who was a voracious collector of many things, including imperial Fabergé eggs, pornography, antique aspirin bottles, paperweights, postage stamps—and coins, of which he had a collection of over 8,500. In 1944, Farouk purchased the 1933 double eagle, and in strict adherence with the law, his ministers applied to the United States Treasury Department for an export license for the coin. Mistakenly, just days before the mint theft was discovered, the license was granted. The Treasury Department attempted to work through diplomatic channels to request the return of the coin from Egypt, but World War II delayed their efforts for several years. In 1952, King Farouk was deposed in a coup d'etat, and the new government put many of his possessions up for public auction. His coins were catalogued by Sotheby & Co. of London and offered in Cairo as The Palace Collections of Egypt, a sale that opened on February 24, 1954. The double eagle was catalogued as part of lot 185, a group of seventeen twenty-dollar pieces dated 1924 to 1933. The United States government requested the return of the coin, and the Egyptian government stated that it would comply with the request; the coin was withdrawn from the lot before the sale and was not seen again in Egypt.

=== 1996 reappearance ===
In 1996, a double eagle surfaced again after over 40 years of obscurity, when British coin dealer Stephen Fenton was arrested by U.S. Secret Service agents during a sting operation at the Waldorf-Astoria Hotel in New York. Although he initially told investigators he bought the coin over the counter at his shop, he later changed his story. Under sworn testimony, he insisted the double eagle had come from the collection of King Farouk, though this could not be verified. Criminal charges against Fenton were subsequently dropped, and he defended his ownership of the coin in civil court. The civil case was settled in 2001 when it was agreed that ownership of the double eagle would revert to the United States government, and the coin could then legally be sold at auction to the highest-bidding private owner. The United States Treasury issued a unique document to "issue and monetize" the coin, thereby making it a legal-tender gold coin in the United States.

When the coin was seized, it was transferred to a holding place believed to be safe: the treasury vaults of the World Trade Center. When the court settlement was reached in July 2001, only two months before the Trade Center was destroyed, the coin was transferred to Fort Knox for safekeeping.

=== 2002 sale ===
On July 30, 2002, the 1933 double eagle was sold to an anonymous bidder at a Stacks Bowers auction held in New York for $6.6 million, plus a 15-percent buyer's premium, and an additional $20 needed to "monetize" the face value of the coin so it would become legal currency. This brought the final sale price to $7,590,020.00, almost twice the previous record for a coin. Half the bid price was to be delivered to the United States Treasury, plus the $20 to monetize the coin, while Stephen Fenton was entitled to the other half. The auction took less than nine minutes.

=== 2021 sale ===
The 2002 buyer remained anonymous for nearly two decades, until March 2021, when it was revealed in a New York Times article to be collector Stuart Weitzman. Weitzman's decision to reveal himself as the coin's owner since 2002 coincided with his decision to sell it, in a Sotheby's auction scheduled for June 2021. The coin was cataloged as Lot 1 in Sotheby's June 8, 2021 auction, and sold that day for $18,872,250.

== Discovery of ten more coins ==
In August 2005, the United States Mint announced the recovery of ten additional stolen 1933 double eagle gold coins from the family of Philadelphia jeweler Israel Switt, the illicit coin dealer identified by the Secret Service as a party to the theft who admitted selling the first nine double eagles recovered a half-century earlier. In September 2004, the coins' ostensible owner, Joan Switt Langbord, voluntarily surrendered the 10 coins to the Secret Service. In July 2005, the coins were authenticated by the United States Mint after working with the Smithsonian Institution, as being genuine 1933 double eagles.

According to various accounts, Israel Switt had many contacts and friends within the Philadelphia Mint, and reportedly had access to many points of the minting process. A secondary source reports that the Secret Service found that only one man, George McCann, had access to the coins at the time and served prison time for similar embezzlement in 1940. Switt may have obtained the stolen 1933 double eagles through a relationship with the head mint cashier. One theory is that McCann swapped previous year double eagles for the 1933 specimens prior to melting, thus avoiding compromise of accounting books and inventory lists.

Coin experts in the numismatic world have advanced an argument that Switt could have legally obtained the 1933 coins when he was exchanging gold bullion for coins. Although the Mint records clearly show that no 1933 double eagles were issued, there were allegedly three weeks in March 1933 when new double eagles could possibly have been legally obtained. The mint began striking double eagles on March 15, and Roosevelt's executive order to ban them was not finalized until April 5. On March 6, 1933, the Secretary of the Treasury ordered the Director of the Mint to pay gold only under license issued by the Secretary, and the United States Mint cashier's daily statements do not reflect that any 1933 double eagles were paid out.

Until the early 1970s (when President Nixon took the United States off of the gold standard and President Ford signed legislation that again made it legal for the public to own gold bullion), any recovered 1933 double eagle, as gold bullion, was required to be melted. Therefore, while double eagles recovered prior to 1974 were melted down, any double eagle recovered now can be spared this fate. Currently, with the exception of the one sold on July 30, 2002, 1933 double eagle coins cannot be the legal possession of any member of the public, as they were never issued and hence remain the property of the United States government.

On October 28, 2010, United States District Court judge Legrome D. Davis released a 20-page decision regarding claims to the coins by descendants of Israel Switt, leading to a trial in July 2011. On July 20, 2011, after a ten-day trial, a jury ruled unanimously in favor of the United States government concerning ownership of the ten additional double eagles. The court concluded that circumstantial evidence proved that Israel Switt had illegally obtained the coins from the United States government and that they are thus still government property. The decision was affirmed on August 29, 2012, and the plaintiffs planned to appeal.

The ten double eagles were stored at the Fort Knox Bullion Depository. They were shown to jurors in Philadelphia during the July 2011 trial, and were then returned to Fort Knox, where they were to remain until a decision was made regarding their disposition. In April 2015, a United States federal appeals court ordered the coins returned to the Langbord family because the original asset seizure was conducted improperly, as the government failed to file a judicial civil forfeiture complaint within 90 days of the family's seized asset claim. This order was reversed on July 28, 2015, and in October 2015, an en banc session was held with 13 judges from the Third Circuit Court of Appeals, where they heard oral arguments in the ongoing appeal. On August 1, 2016, the judges reversed the previous ruling, finding the coins to be property of the United States government. The Langbords appealed to the U.S. Supreme Court, which on April 17, 2017 denied certiorari.

The 1933 double eagles were viewed by U.S. Treasury Secretary Steven Mnuchin and Senate Majority Leader Mitch McConnell on their August 21, 2017 visit to the United States Bullion Depository at Fort Knox. The Freedom of Information Act document released after their visit references the coins as "ten (10) '1933 Double Eagle' gold coins recently returned to the custody of the Mint."

In 2018, the Mint disclosed that an anonymous individual had returned another 1933 double eagle stolen by Swift after it was determined the coins were stolen property.

On August 28, 2026, during the American Numismatic Association's World's Fair of Money, 11 of the coins were exhibited together at the David L. Lawrence Convention Center, the first time they were ever placed on public display.

== See also ==
- 1974 aluminum cent
- Eagle (U.S. coin)
- List of most expensive coins

== Documentary ==
- Hunt for Double Eagle, French version: A la recherche de la pièce perdue, produced by Laura Jones (Fulcrum TV), directed by Tilman Remme, 53 min, 2010
