= 1942 experimental cents =

United States pattern coins

Cent
- United States
- Value: $0.01 U.S. dollars
- Diameter: 19.05 mm
- Edge: Plain
- Years of minting: 1942

Obverse
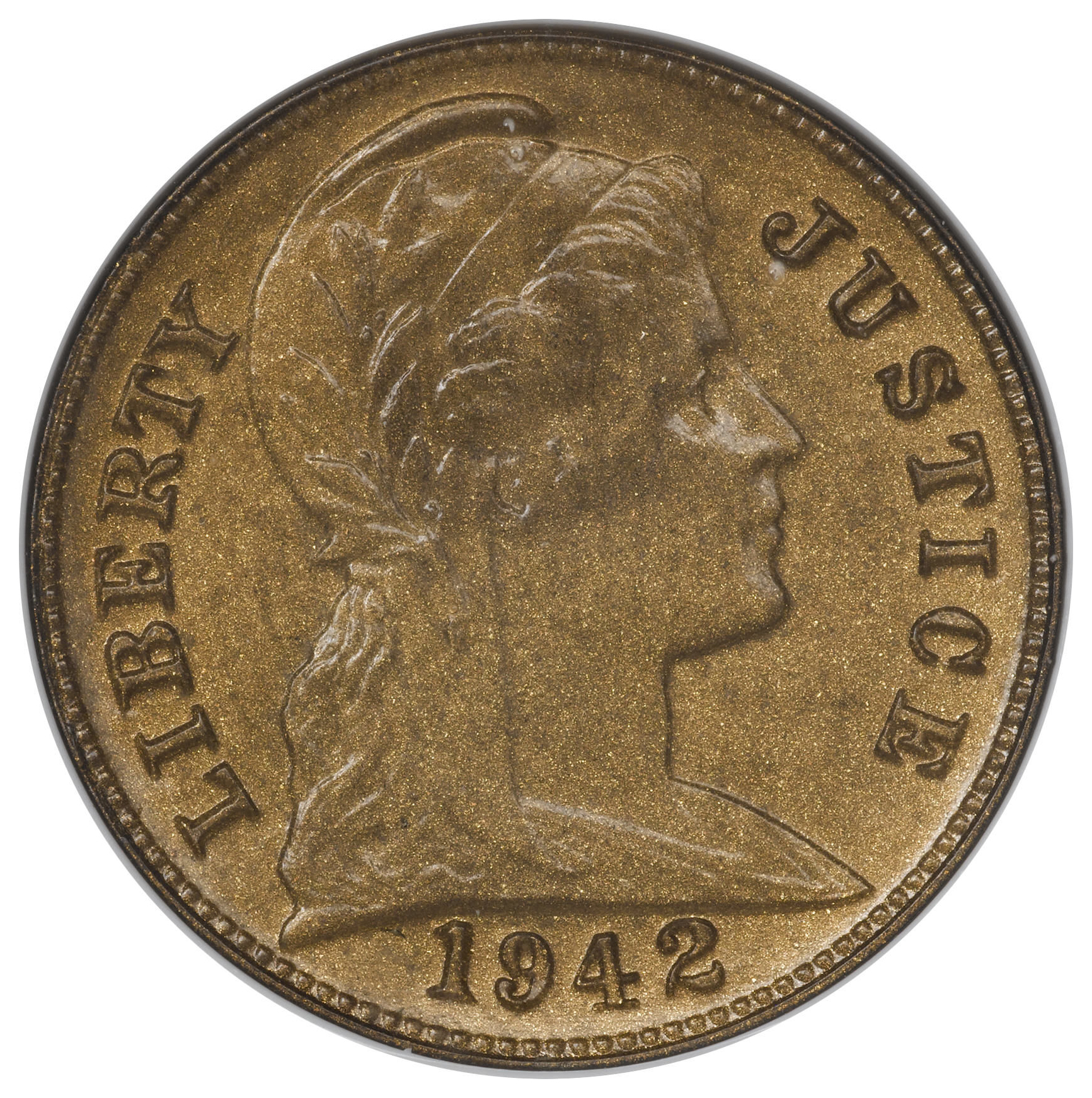
- Design: Bust from the Colombian 2 centavo coin
- Designer: Unknown
- Design date: Unknown (original), 1942 (modified)
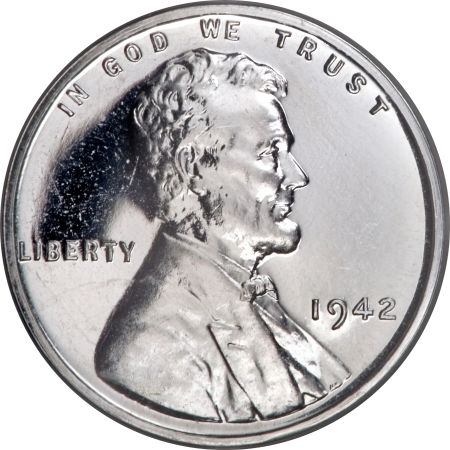
- Design: Abraham Lincoln
- Designer: Victor D. Brenner
- Design date: 1909

Reverse
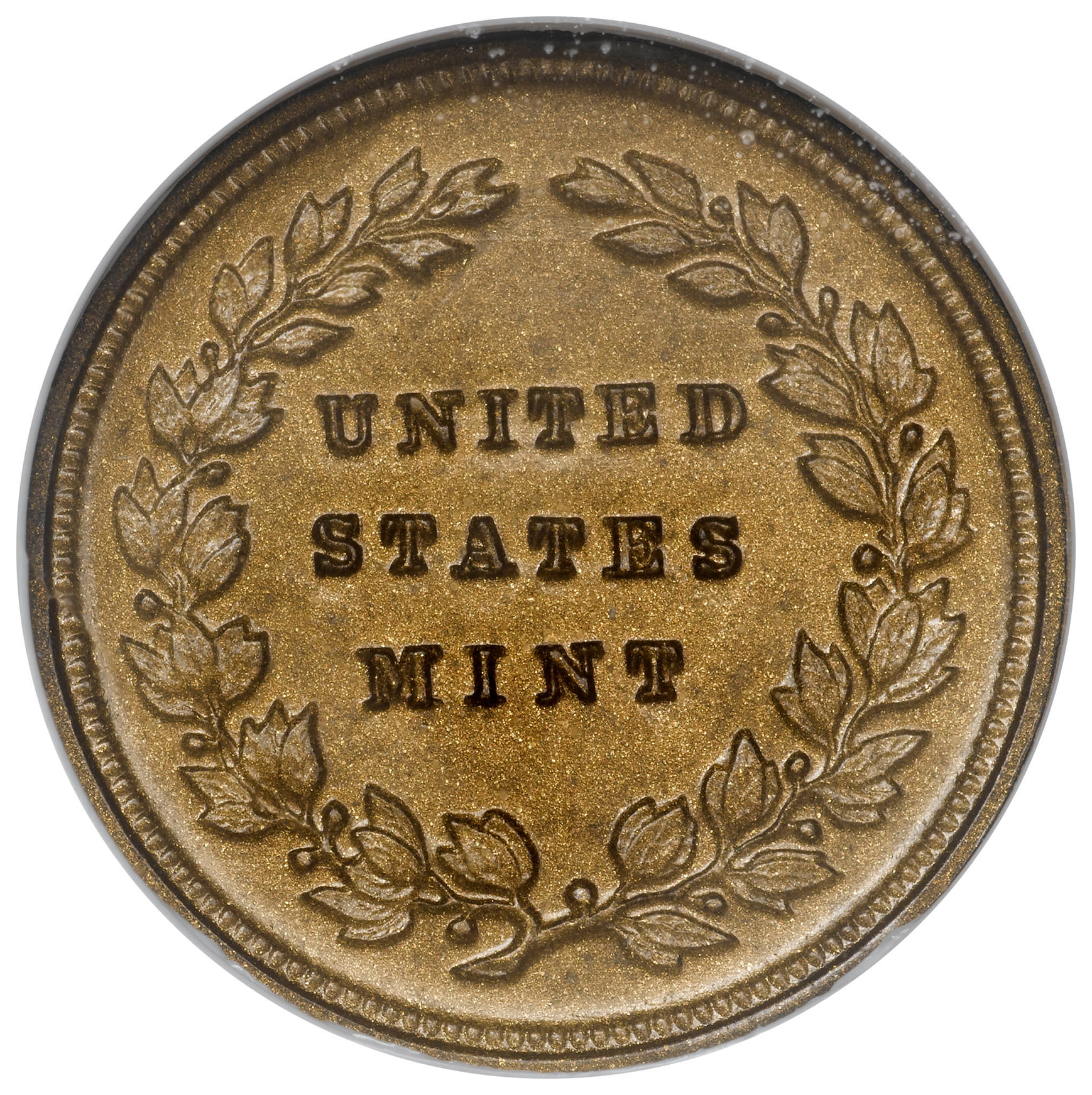
- Design: Wreath
- Designer: Unknown
- Design date: Unknown
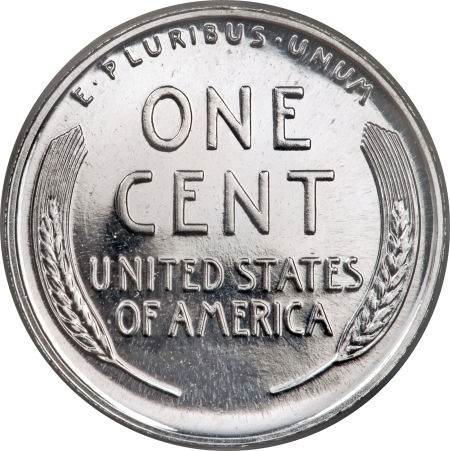
- Design: Wheat heads
- Designer: Victor D. Brenner
- Design date: 1909

The 1942 experimental cents were pattern coins struck by the United States Mint to test alternative compositions for the penny.

== History ==
After the outbreak of World War II, the demand for copper rose as it was used in ammunition and other military equipment. The US Mint researched ways to reduce or eliminate the usage of copper in cent production. The mint struck pattern coins in various metals, using the obverse design of the Colombian two centavo coin. Dies were sent to various companies to test possible non-metal compositions. Patterns were also struck with modified rim Lincoln cent dies.

One of the compositions tested, zinc-coated steel, was chosen for the 1943 cent.

== Compositions ==
=== Colombian patterns ===
Composition	Catalog number	Produced by	Notes
Bronze	J2051/P2073	United States Mint	
Brass	J2052	United States Mint	
Zinc	J2053	United States Mint	
Zinc-coated steel	J2054/P2074	United States Mint	This composition was chosen for the 1943 cent
Manganese	J2055/P2075	United States Mint	
White metal	J2056	United States Mint	
Aluminum	J2057/P2076	United States Mint	
Lead	J2058	United States Mint	
Bakelite	J2067/P4001	Bakelite Corporation	
Transparent amber plastic	J2065/P4005	Unknown	
Hard rubber	J2068/P4010	Unknown	
Lead grey plastic	J2061/P4015	Unknown	
Fibrous black plastic	J2059/P4020	Unknown	
Light tan plastic	J2063/P4025	Unknown	
Dark tan plastic	J2063/P4030	Unknown	
Brown plastic	J2060/P4035	Unknown	
Brown plastic	J2070	Auburn Button Works	Mirrored image, struck from hub dies
Brass-colored plastic	J2064/P4040	Unknown	
Red-brown plastic	J2062/P4045	Unknown	Coin alignment
Red-brown plastic	J2062/P4050	Unknown	Medal alignment
Rust-colored plastic	J2062/P4053	Durez Plastics and Chemicals	
Red fibrous material	J2066	Unknown	
Tempered glass	J2069	Blue Ridge Glass Company	

=== Lincoln patterns ===
Composition	Catalog number	Produced by	Notes
Aluminum	J2079	United States Mint	Struck with standard proof dies
Zinc-coated steel	J2080	United States Mint	Reported, but not confirmed
White metal	J2081	United States Mint	Struck with modified rim Lincoln cent dies

== See also ==
- Silver center cent
- Ring cent
- 1943 steel cent
- 1974 aluminum cent
