= USMP =

USMP may stand for:

- United States Mint Police
- United States Military Police
- US Marijuana Party
- United States Microgravity Payload
- Universidad San Martín de Porres
