= United States Bullion Depository =

Fortified vault building in Fort Knox, Kentucky

- United States Bullion Depository; Fort Knox, Kentucky
- U.S. National Register of Historic Places
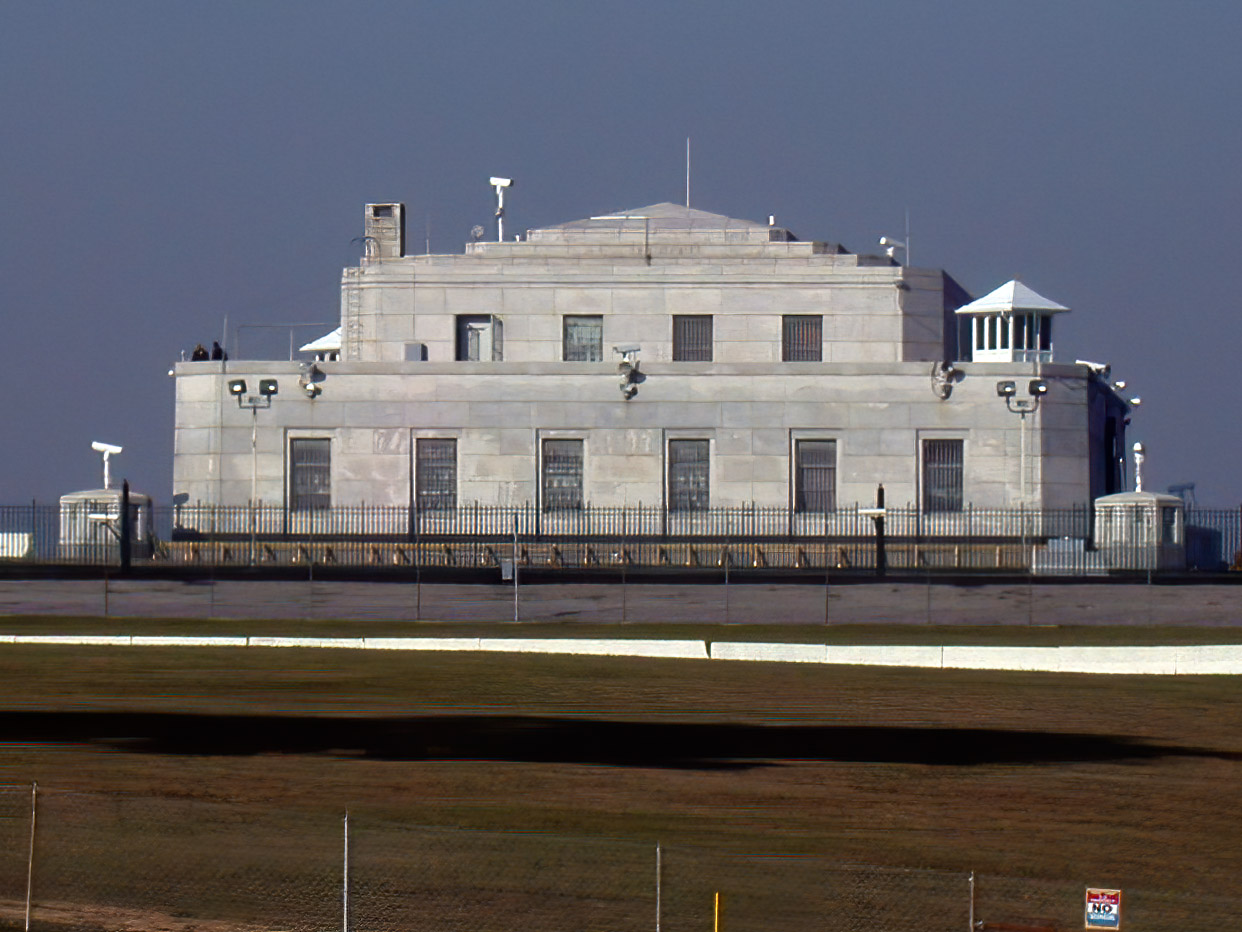
- The United States Bullion Depository

- Location within Kentucky Location within the United States
- Location: Gold Vault Rd. and Bullion Blvd. Fort Knox, Kentucky
- Coordinates: 37.8833°N 85.9653°W
- Area: 42 acres (17 ha)
- Built: 1936
- Built by: Great Lakes Construction
- Architect: Louis A. Simon
- Engineer: Neal A. Melick
- Architectural style: Art Deco
- Website: Depository webpage at U.S. Mint
- NRHP reference No.: 88000056
- Added to NRHP: February 18, 1988

The United States Bullion Depository, often known as Fort Knox, is a fortified vault building located next to the United States Army post of Fort Knox, Kentucky. It is operated by the United States Department of the Treasury. The vault is used to store a large portion of the United States' gold reserves as well as other precious items belonging to or in custody of the federal government. As of 2025 it holds 147.3 million troy ounces (4,580 metric tons) of gold bullion, a little over half the total gold presently held by the federal government. The United States Mint Police protect the depository.

The Treasury built the depository in 1936 on land transferred to it from the military. Its purpose was to house gold then stored in New York City and Philadelphia, in keeping with a strategy to move gold reserves away from coastal cities to areas less vulnerable to foreign military attack. The first set of gold shipments to the depository occurred during the first half of 1937. A second set was completed in 1941. These shipments, overseen by the United States Post Office Department, totaled roughly 417 million troy ounces (12,960 metric tons), almost two-thirds of the total gold reserves of the United States.

During World War II the signed original Constitution of the United States, Declaration of Independence, Articles of Confederation, Lincoln's Second Inaugural Address and drafts of Lincoln's Gettysburg Address were stored in its vault for protection, as was a Gutenberg Bible and an exemplified copy of Magna Carta. After the war, the depository held the Crown of St. Stephen as well as stockpiles of opium and morphine. It is known to hold ten 1933 Double Eagle gold coins, a 1974-D aluminum cent, and twelve gold (22-karat) Sacagawea dollar coins that flew on the Space Shuttle Columbia, specifically STS-93 in 1999.

The depository is a secure facility. Between its fenced perimeter and granite-lined concrete structure lie rings of razor wire. The grounds are monitored by high-resolution night vision video cameras and microphones. The subterranean vault is made of steel plates, I-beams and cylinders encased in concrete. Its torch-and-drill resistant door is 21 inches (53 cm) thick and weighs 20 short tons (18 metric tons). The vault door is set on a 100-hour time lock, and can only be opened by members of the depository staff who must dial separate combinations. Visitors are not allowed inside. Due to its reputation for security, the phrase "as safe as Fort Knox" has become a cliché for safety and security.

== History ==
The building was listed on the National Register of Historic Places in 1988 for its status as a "well-known landmark that is referred to frequently in factual and fictitious contexts" and its "exceptional significance" in the "nation's economic history". The site is located on what is now the intersection of Bullion Boulevard and Gold Vault Road.

=== Planning and completion ===
In June 1935, the U.S. Treasury announced its intention to quickly build a gold depository on the grounds of Fort Knox, Kentucky. Its purpose was to store gold then kept in the New York City Assay Office and the Philadelphia Mint. This intent was in keeping with a policy previously announced to move gold reserves away from coastal cities to areas less vulnerable to foreign military invasion. This policy had already led to the shipment of nearly 85.7 million troy ounces (2,666 metric tons) of gold from the San Francisco Mint to the Denver Mint. The initial plans were to be completed by August and called for a 10,000-square-foot (930 m^{2}) building costing no more than $450,000 (equivalent to $8,200,000 in 2025).

Cited were several military advantages of the location. An army attacking from the Eastern Seaboard would have to fight through the Appalachian Mountains, which were considered a reasonable impediment to military forces of the time. It was also isolated from railways and highways which would further hinder an attacking power. Even air travel to the location across the mountains was considered dangerous for a pilot unfamiliar with the territory. Finally, the Army's only completely mechanized cavalry unit was stationed at the adjacent Fort and could readily be deployed to defend the depository.

The Treasury began construction of the United States Bullion Depository in 1936 on land transferred to it from the military. The Gold Vault was completed in December of that year for $560,000 (equivalent to $10,200,000 in 2025).

=== Early gold shipments ===
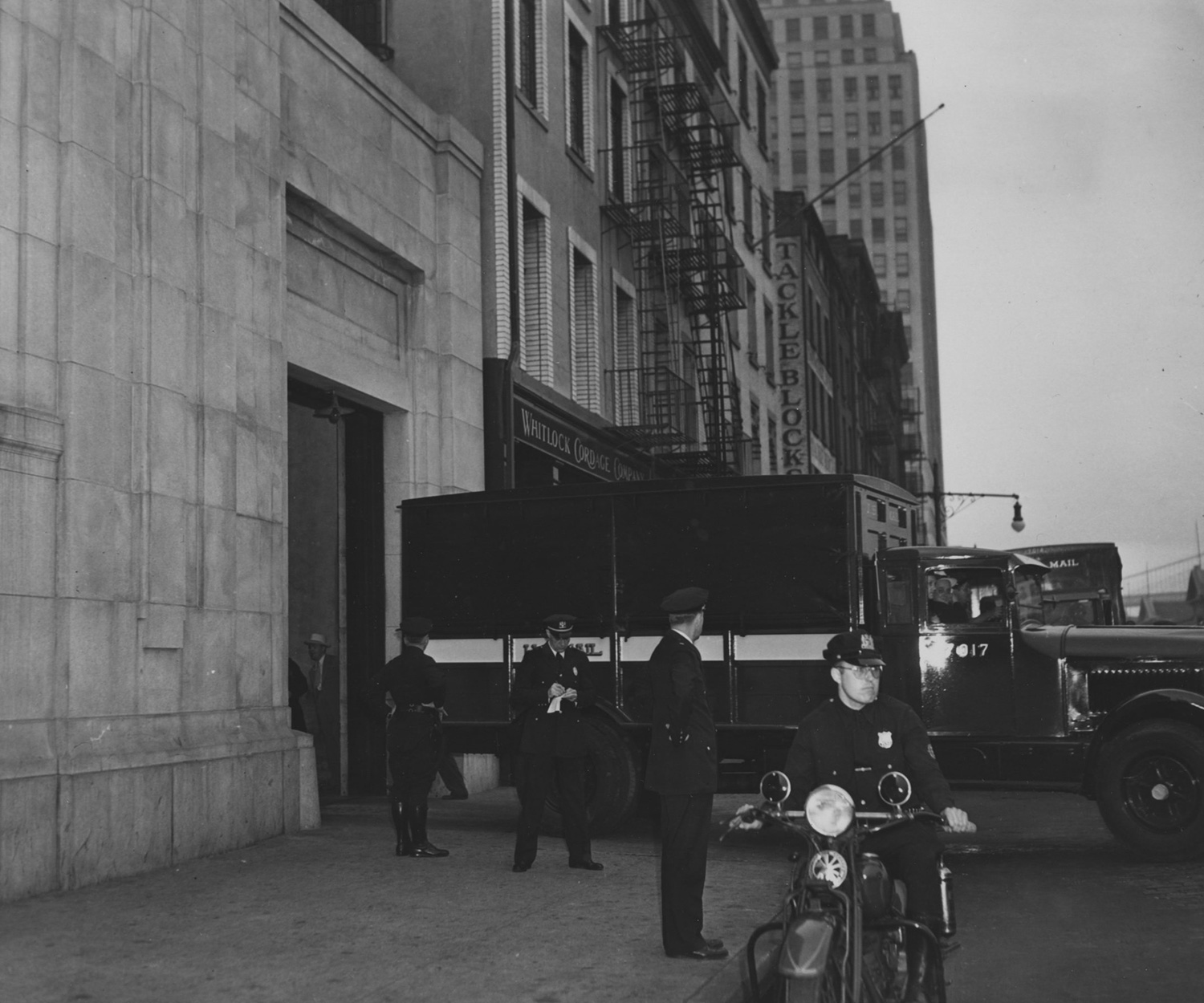
Loaded mail truck leaves the New York City Assay Office, 1941.

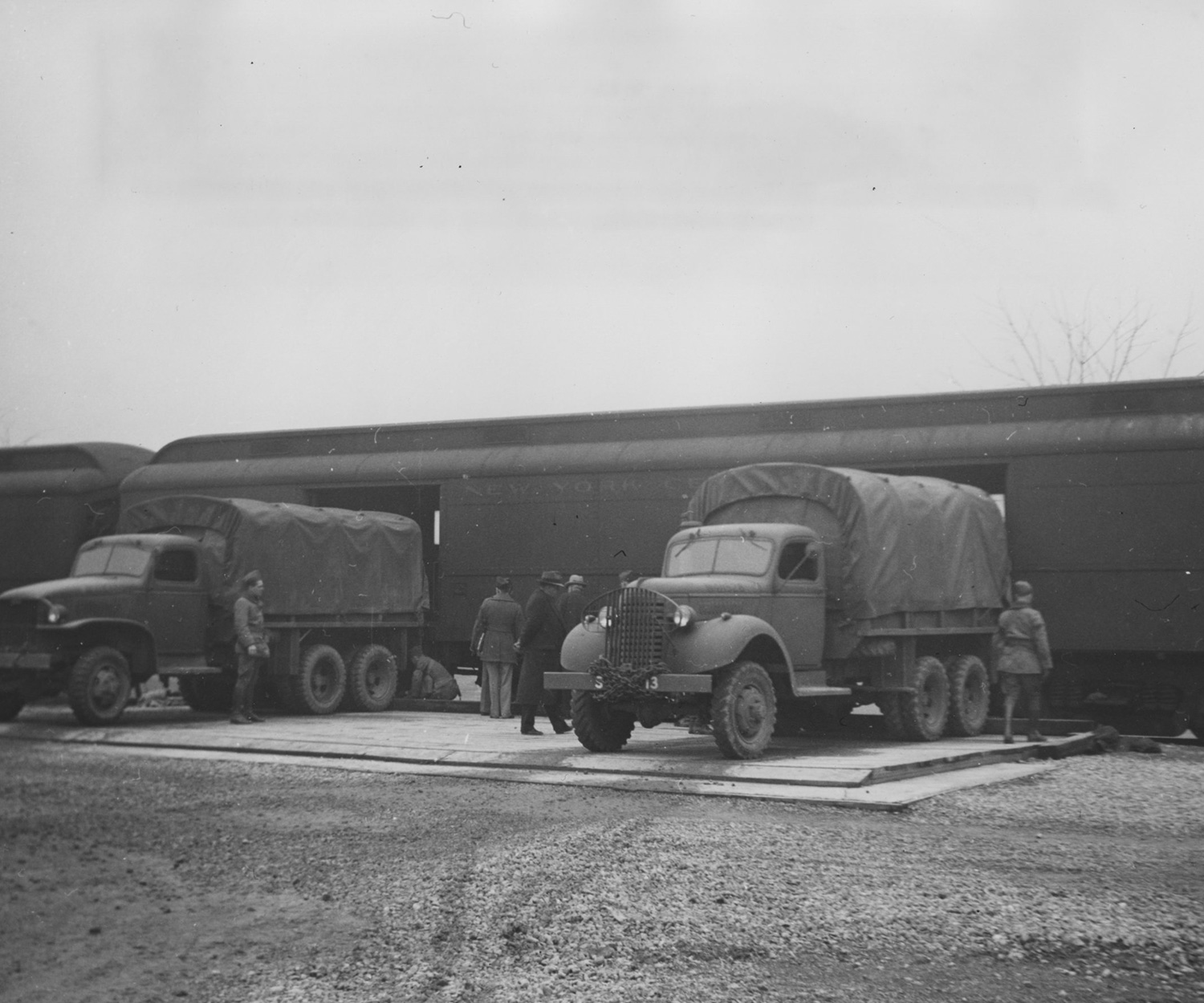
Gold trains preparing to unload bullion onto Army trucks, 1941

The first wave of gold shipments was made semi-weekly between January 11 and June 17, 1937, and overseen by the United States Post Office Department. The gold was transported from the New York Assay Office and the Philadelphia Mint onto trains using postal trucks and municipal police escorts. In the armored train cars, postal workers were accompanied by soldiers, secret service agents, and mint guards. Decoy trains were employed. The gold was transferred from trains onto Army trucks under the protection of soldiers armed with armor-piercing bullets and machine guns. The trucks were escorted by combat cars of the 1st U.S. Cavalry Regiment to the depository. The Post Office Department billed the Treasury Department for transporting the weight of the crates and gold using the fourth-class postage rate with added insurance fees.

A total of 157.82 million troy ounces (4,909 metric tons) were moved to Fort Knox in this wave. This shipment represented 44.84% of total U.S. gold reserves, which were 351.9 million troy ounces (10,947 metric tons) at that time. It took over five months and required 39 trains consisting of 215 cars.

On March 1, 1941, United States Secretary of the Treasury Henry Morgenthau Jr. announced the completion of another shipment totaling 258.74 million troy ounces (8,048 metric tons) of gold from the New York Assay office to the depository. The total amount at the vault after completion of the shipment was 416.56 million troy ounces (12,956 metric tons). This amount represented 65.58% of total U.S. gold reserves, which were 635.2 million troy ounces (19,757 metric tons) at that time. This wave of shipments began in July of the previous year and was also overseen by the Post Office. It took seven months and required 45 trains consisting of 337 cars.

==== Accumulation of reserves ====
The building and early operation of the depository occurred at the same time total gold reserves in the United States experienced unprecedented growth. These reserves, which were 194 million troy ounces (6,019 metric tons) at the end of 1933, jumped to 503 million troy ounces (15,641 metric tons) by the end of 1939. Factors driving this growth included the gold price revaluation (dollar devaluation) in 1934 spurring a rise in global gold production, political uncertainties in Europe causing a capital flight to the United States, and re-armament programs in Europe which increased U.S. net merchandise exports.

By far, most of the increase, 277 million troy ounces (8,620 metric tons), were the result of gold imports from abroad. This consisted of 174 million troy ounces (5,421 metric tons) out of foreign mines (mainly from South Africa), 89 million troy ounces (2,755 metric tons) out of foreign central bank reserves (mostly France and the United Kingdom), with the balance from other sources (principally private holdings in India). Only 6 million troy ounces (178 metric tons) came from gold acquired in January 1934 under the gold-buying program of Executive Order 6102 (which required individuals and institutions deliver to the government all but a small amount of their gold coin and bullion), and 26 million troy ounces (800 metric tons) from domestic production and return of scrap gold and coin after January.

By the end of 1940, total Treasury reserves stored at all locations rose to 628.4 million troy ounces (19,546 metric tons). This accounted for around 80 percent of the entire world's gold reserves. Total U.S. gold reserves stored at all locations peaked in October 1941 at 651.4 million troy ounces (20,262 metric tons) and ended the year at 649.6 million troy ounces (20,206 metric tons).

=== Historic documents ===
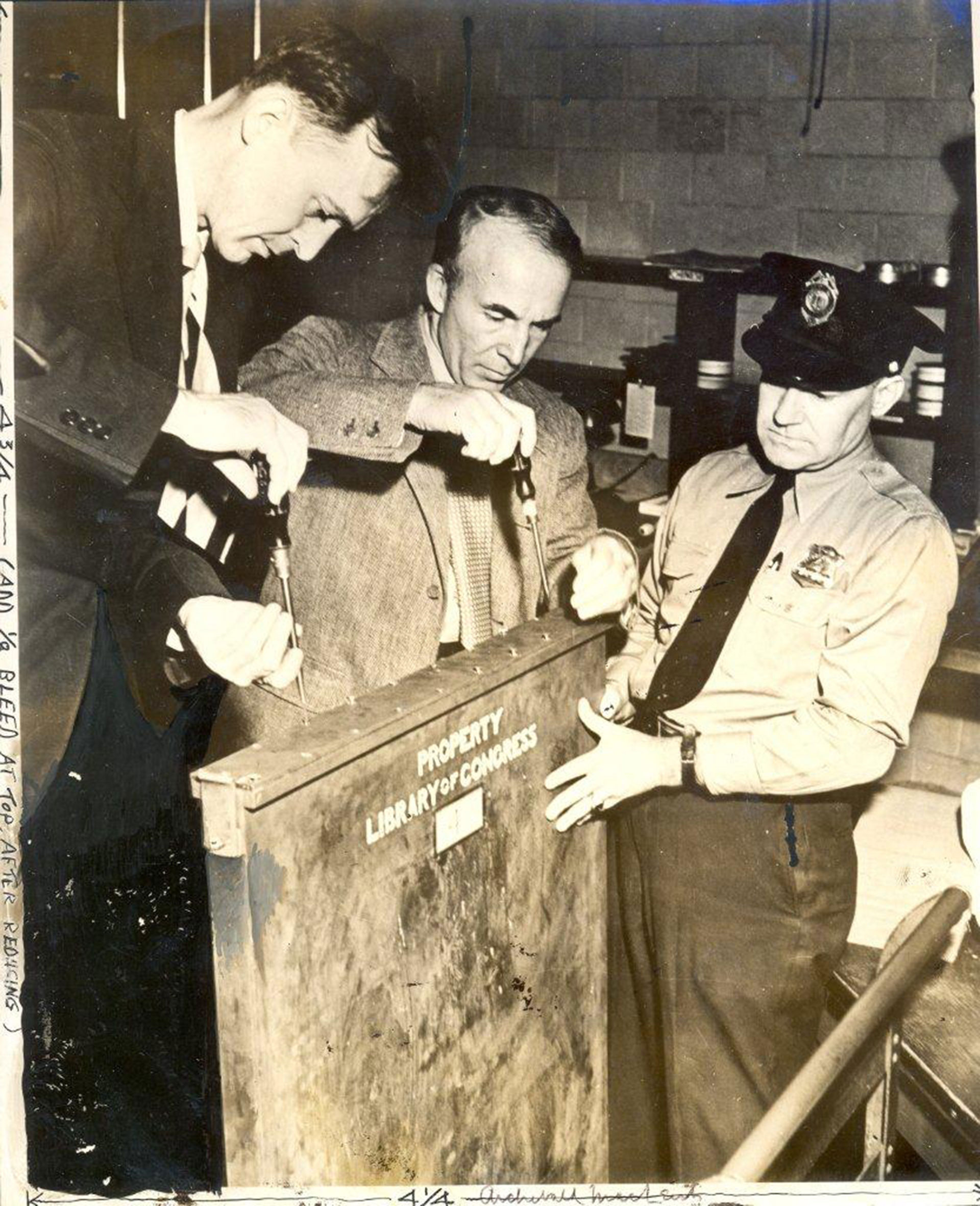
Archibald Macleish unboxing the Declaration of Independence and US Constitution after arriving back to the Library of Congress in October 1944 after having been stored at Fort Knox

Librarian of Congress Archibald MacLeish expressed concern with the safety of the library's precious artifacts as soon as he took office in 1939. As the Battle of Britain was fought during the summer and fall of 1940, MacLeish asked the U.S. Geological Survey about locating underground storage for "valuable paintings and books" and "within reasonable distance of Washington." In December 1940, he directed his staff to create a detailed catalog of the Library of Congress's most "irreplaceable" assets, and the space required to store them. Primary attention was given to those items "considered most important for the history of democracy."

When it became clear that Congress would not fund the building of a separate facility, Macleish sought other options. On April 30, 1941, he requested of the Treasury Secretary some thousands of cubic feet at Fort Knox for the most notable items in the library. The secretary replied, offering the librarian ten cubic feet. In July, when the inventory was complete, and it had been determined that some 40,000 cubic feet (1,100 m^{3}) would be required for the storage of all unique and irreplaceable materials of the library, the original ten cubic feet (0.28 m^{3}) offer was raised to 60.3 cubic feet (1.71 m^{3}).

MacLeish prioritized items to be sent to Fort Knox. These items were: the Constitution of the United States (signed original); the Declaration of Independence (signed original); Lincoln's Second Inaugural Address (autographed original); Lincoln's Gettysburg Address (first and second autographed drafts); a Gutenberg Bible (St. Blasius–St. Paul copy); the Articles of Confederation (signed original); and Lincoln Cathedral's exemplified copy of Magna Carta, which had been on loan to the United States for the 1939 New York World's Fair. The items were packed in four crates and then shipped by train to the depository on December 26, 1941.

While the vault was invulnerable to bombing attack, it was not climate controlled, and so the documents were vulnerable to changes in temperature and humidity, as well as insects. Special precautions were then taken. The items were locked in bronze containers that had been heated for six hours to drive off any moisture. The containers were then embedded in mineral wool and placed in wooden cases hermetically sealed with lead. An air conditioning unit and calcium chloride dryers were installed in the vault. Frequent inspections were made. In May 1942, repairs were made to the Declaration. In April 1943, the Declaration and the Constitution were removed from and then taken back to the depository so they could be displayed at the opening of the Jefferson Memorial. On October 1, 1944, all items were returned to the Library of Congress. The copy of Magna Carta was returned to England after the war in January 1946.

=== Other artifacts ===
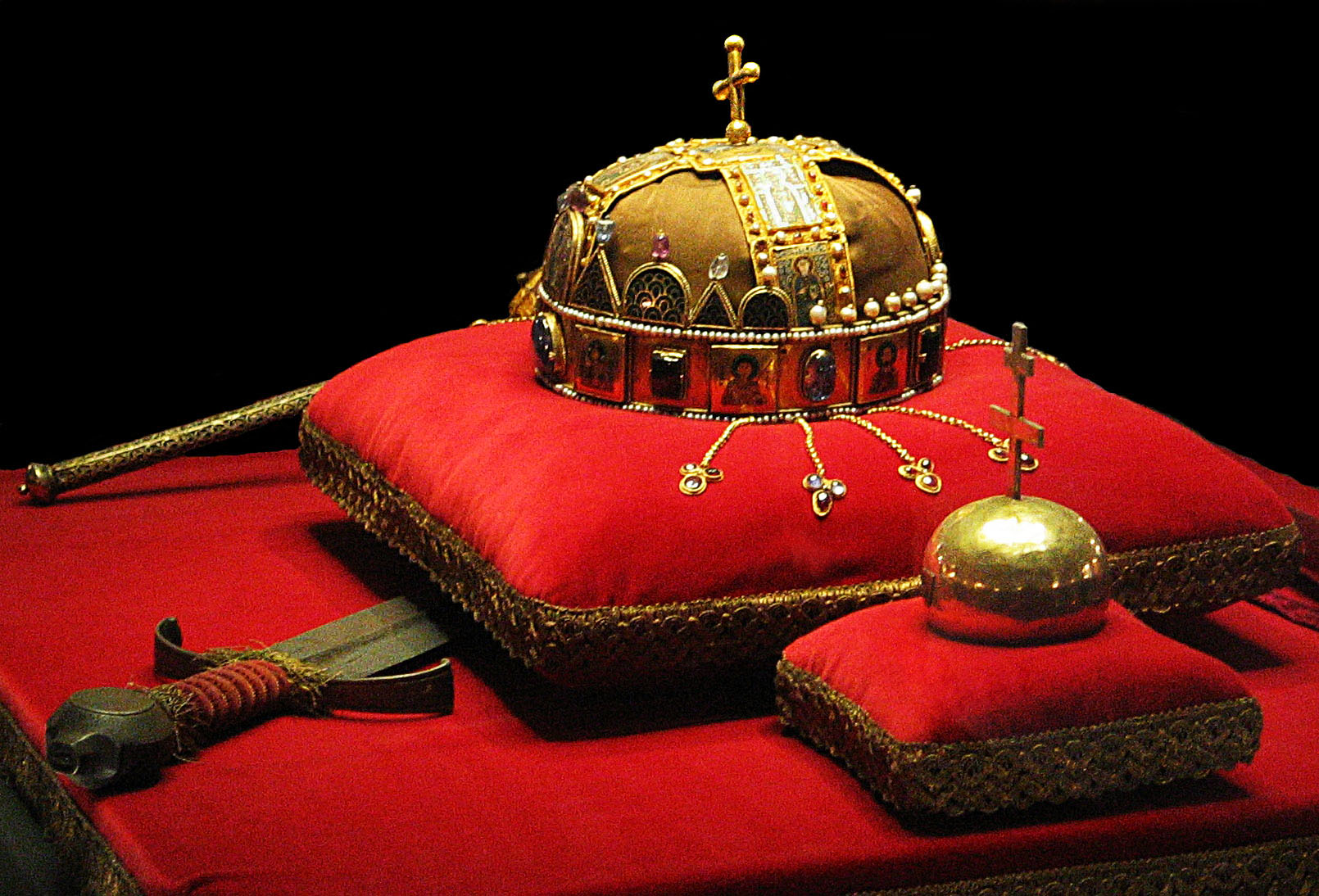
The Crown, Sword, Scepter and Globus Cruciger of Hungary

After World War II, the depository held the Crown of St. Stephen, as well as other Hungarian crown jewels including a gold scepter and orb and a gold‐encrusted mantle. They were given to U.S. military authorities by members of the Royal Hungarian Crown Guard who feared that they would otherwise fall into Soviet hands. The items were kept in Germany under U.S. custody for several years before being transferred to Fort Knox. They were returned to Hungary in 1978.

In 1955, the Defense Logistics Agency began storing opium and morphine at the depository and the West Point Mint. This was done to ensure the nation had adequate supplies in case of war or supply disruptions from the limited number of poppy exporters. The stockpile grew to 68,269 pounds (30,966 kg), enough to meet the legal painkiller needs of the entire United States for one year if supplies were cut off. As the Cold War ended, and more nations began exporting concentrated poppy straw, concerns about supply disruptions abated. But the agency could not legally sell its opium or morphine stock without congressional approval. So, in 1993, it converted its remaining opium reserves into morphine sulfate. This was done to extend the life of the stock since morphine has a longer shelf-life than opium. Morphine is no longer stored at the depository.

== Construction and security ==
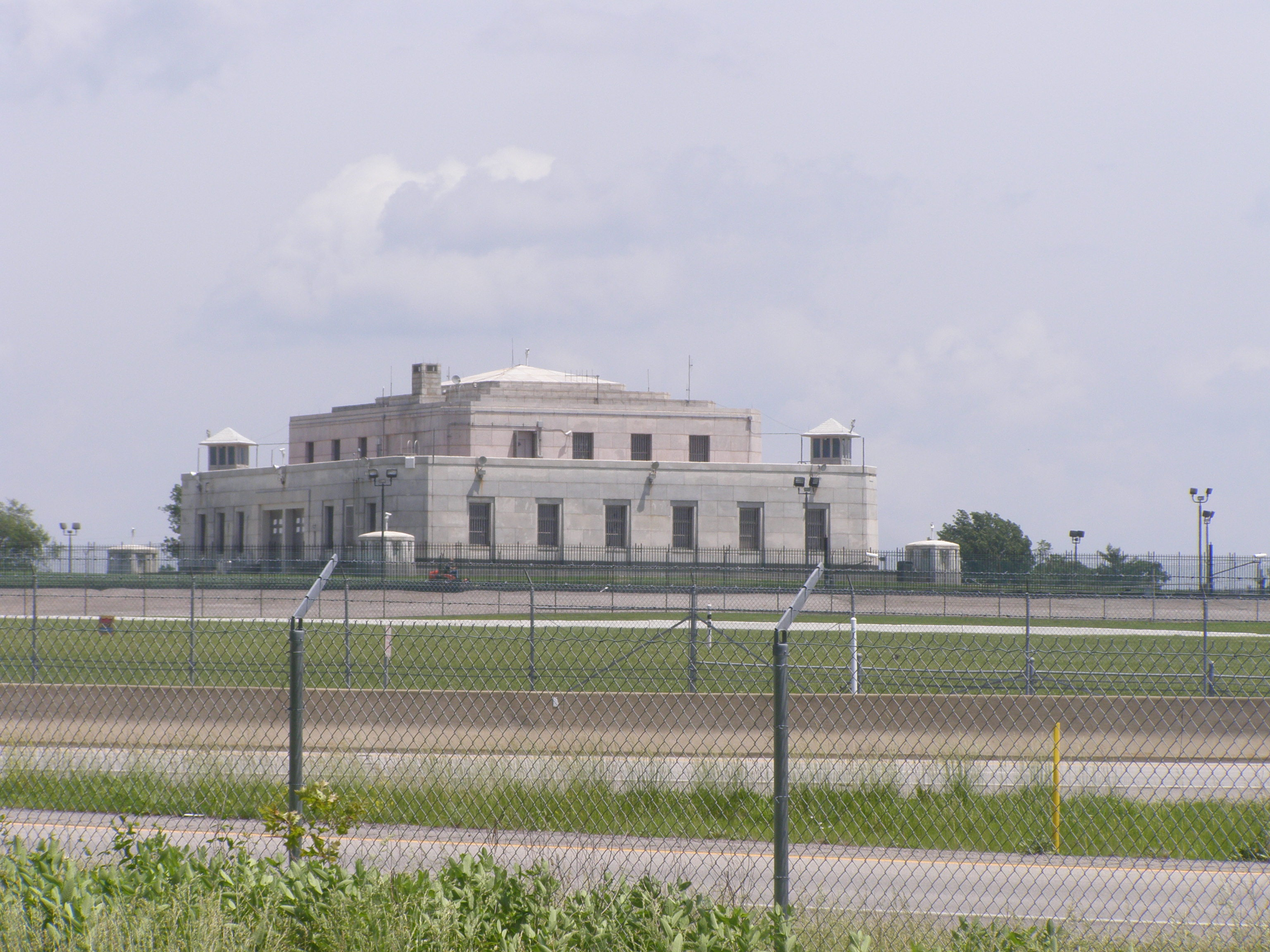
US Bullion Depository, 2011

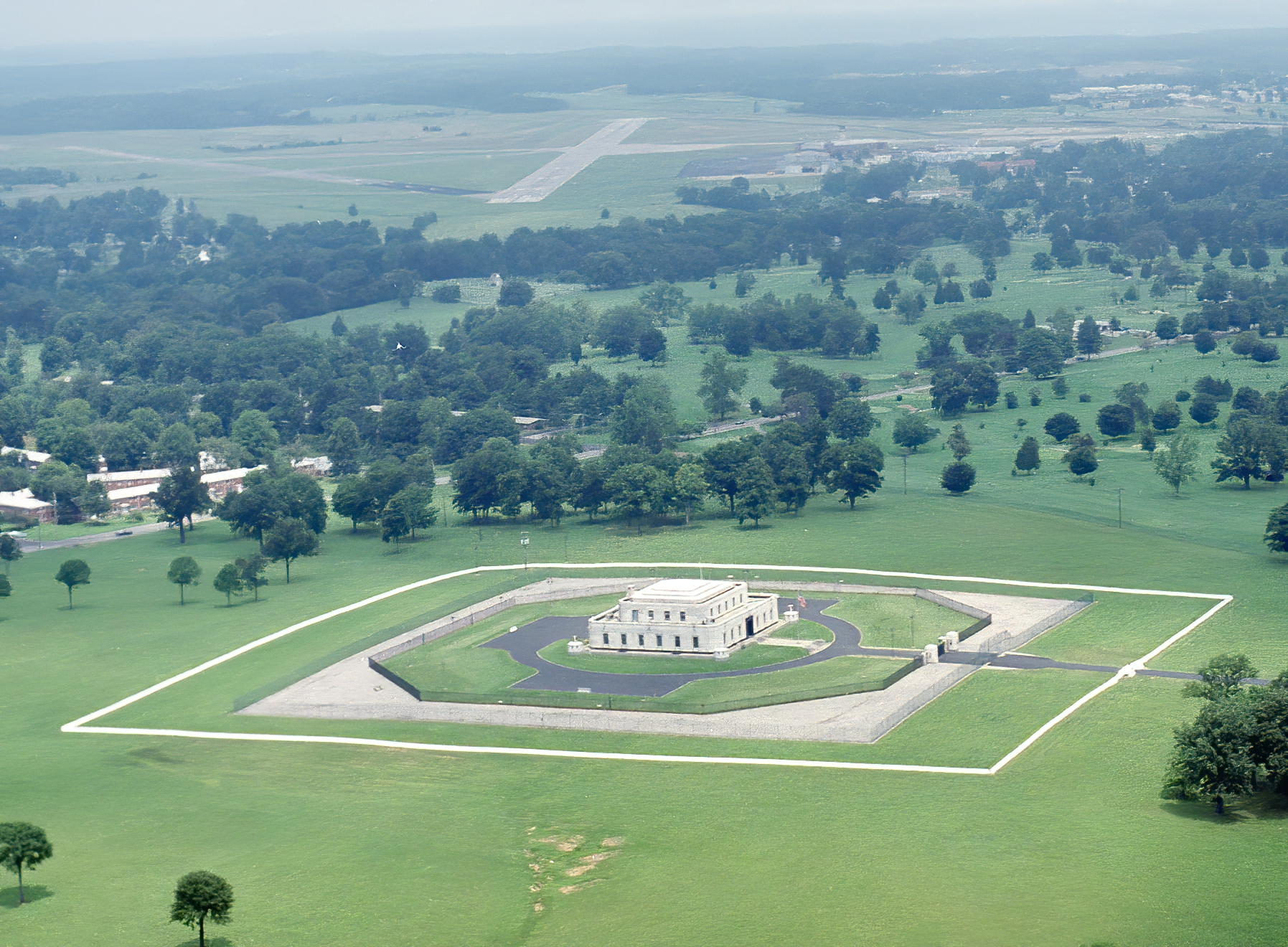
Aerial view, 1989

The building measures 105 feet (32 m) by 121 feet (37 m) and is 42 feet (13 m) above ground level. Materials used to construct the building include 16,500 cubic feet (470 m^{3}) of granite (quarried at the North Carolina Granite Corporation Quarry Complex), 4,200 cubic yards (3,200 m^{3}) of concrete, 750 short tons (680 metric tons) of reinforced steel and 670 short tons (610 metric tons) of structural steel. The outer wall is made of granite-lined concrete. There are guard boxes at each of the four corners of the structure. Sentry boxes are located at the entrance gate. The words "United States Depository" are inscribed over the marble front entrance. Above the inscription is the seal of the Department of the Treasury, in gold. Offices of the Officer in Charge and the Captain of the Guard open upon the entrance lobby. At the rear of the building is another entrance used for receiving bullion and supplies.

Below the fortress-like structure lies the gold vault. The vault is made of steel plates, steel I-beams and steel cylinders laced with hoop bands and encased in concrete. It is less than 4,000 square feet (370 m^{2}) in area, and two stories high. The Mosler Safe Company made the vault. According to a Mosler brochure, both the vault door and emergency door are 21 inches (53 cm) thick and made of the latest torch-and-drill-resistant material of the time. The main vault door weighs 20 short tons (18 metric tons), and the vault casing is 25 inches (64 cm). The vault door is set on a 100-hour time lock and is rarely opened. To open the vault, members of the depository staff must dial separate combinations known only to them.

There is an escape tunnel from the lower level of the vault to be used by someone who has been accidentally locked in. It can only be opened from inside the vault and only when the vault doors are closed and locked. The tunnel leads into the main building.

The facility is surrounded by fences and is guarded by the United States Mint Police. Between the outer perimeter and the depository walls lie rings of razor wire. These grounds are monitored by high-resolution night vision video cameras and microphones. The depository is equipped with its own emergency power and water systems.

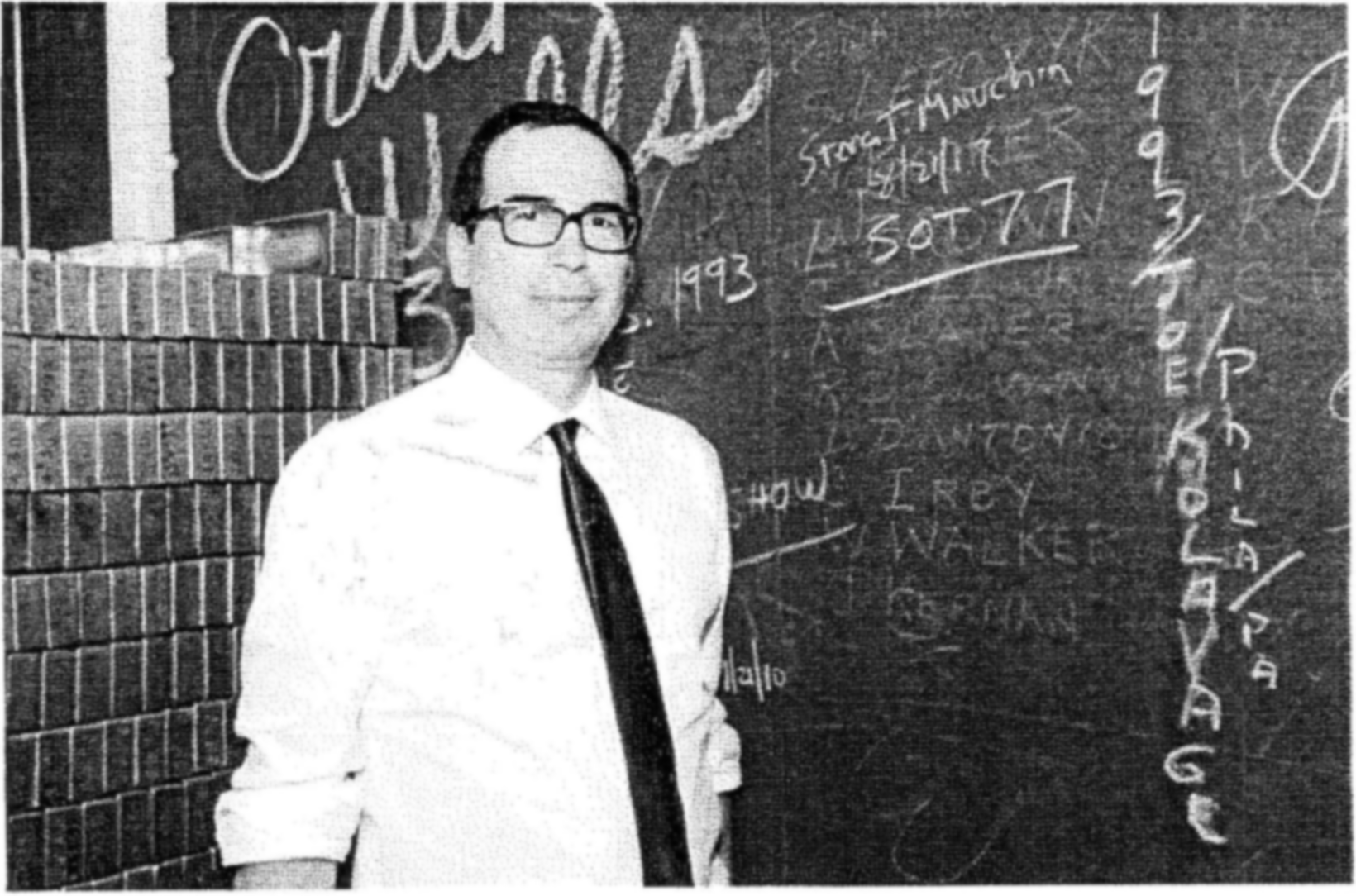
Treasury Secretary Mnuchin inside the vault

For security reasons, visitors are not allowed inside the depository grounds. There have been only three reported occasions when guests outside the Treasury Department have made inspection tours of the vault. The first was by President Franklin Roosevelt in 1943. A second inspection was made by members of the United States Congress and the news media on September 23, 1974, led by the Director of the United States Mint, Mary Brooks. The tour was in response to a conspiracy theory, circulated by Peter Beter, that elites had secretly removed the gold in the depository and that the vaults were empty. The third inspection tour was on August 21, 2017, when Kentucky Senator Mitch McConnell visited with a small group of officials and staff, including Secretary of the Treasury Steven Mnuchin. According to a tweet by Mnuchin, and an internal email by Chief of the U.S. Mint Police Dennis O'Connor, he was the first Treasury Secretary to visit the depository since John Wesley Snyder in 1948.

== Current holdings ==
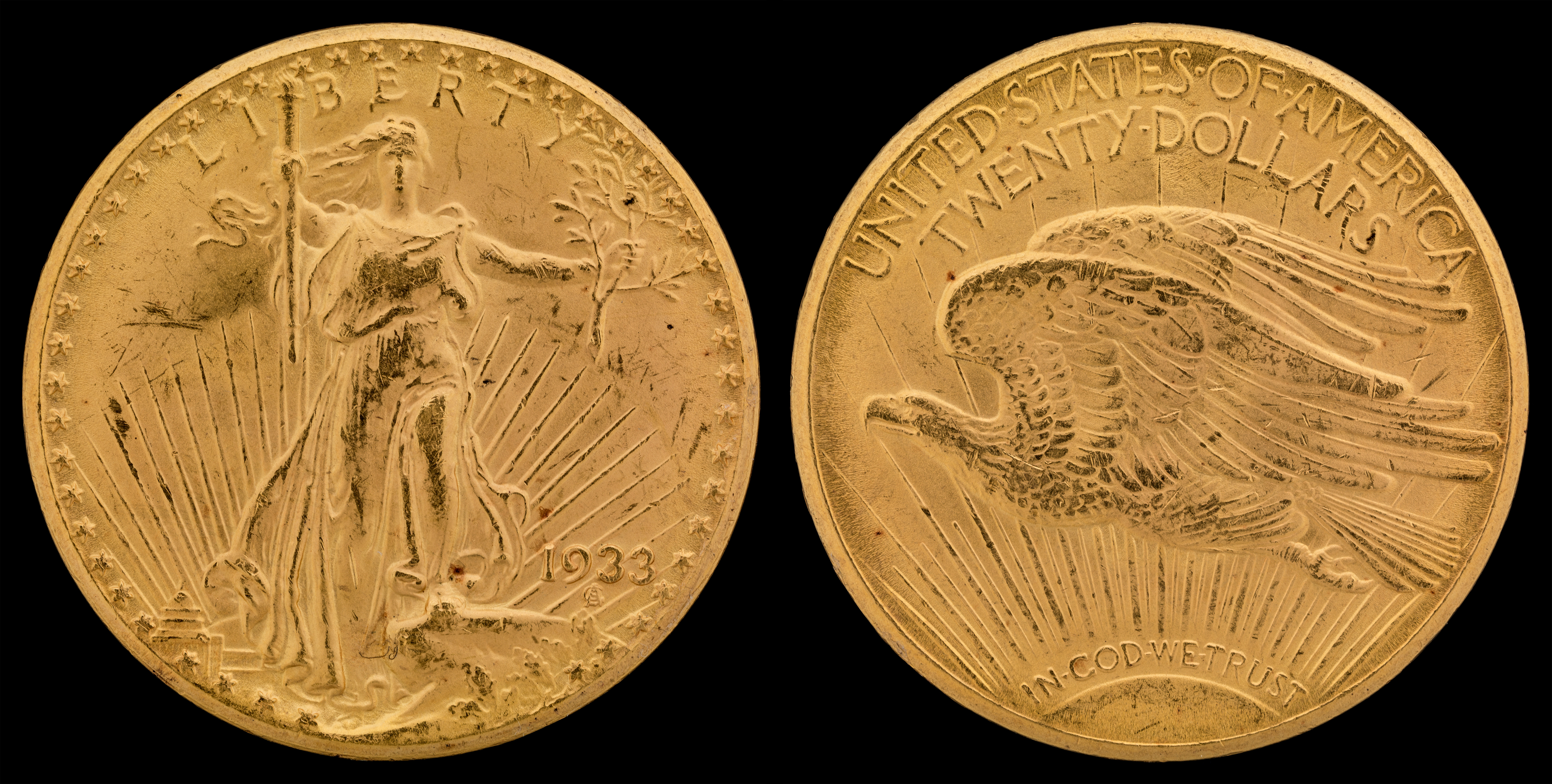
1933 double eagle

As of July 31, 2020, Fort Knox holds 147.34 million troy ounces (4,583 metric tons) of gold reserves with a market value of US $290.9 billion, representing 56.35% of the gold reserves of the United States. As of 2021, the U.S. gold reserves total 8,134 metric tons. The next highest holdings were Germany's, whose gold reserves were 3,364 metric tons.

The gold bars held in the depository are approximately seven inches long, three and a half inches wide, and one and three-quarters inches thick. While each of these bars contains the equivalent of about 400 troy ounces (12.4 kilograms) of pure gold, they differ in their composition. Mint gold bars are a minimum of 99.5% fine gold, while coin bars, which were made from melted gold coins, are the same composition as the coins from which they were made.

The 1934 London Good Delivery List, published by the London Gold Market (a precursor of the London Bullion Market Association), defined coin bars as "bars assaying 899 to 901 per mille or 915 1/2 to 917 per mille and containing between 350 and 420 ounces of fine gold". These two different levels of fineness reflected the composition of gold coins of the day. U.S. coins produced from 1838 through 1933 were made with 90% gold alloyed with 10% copper, while U.K. crown gold coins were minted with a gold proportion of 22 parts to 24 (91 2/3%). These lower gold ratios contrast to many 99.9% fine gold bullion coins minted in modern times since older coins were intended for circulation while newer coins are not.

In 2011, the U.S. Treasury's full detailed schedules of gold bars were published by the U.S. House Committee on Financial Services as part of submissions for its hearing titled "Investigating the Gold: H.R. 1495, the Gold Reserve Transparency Act of 2011 and the Oversight of United States Gold Holdings". From the schedule, it can be seen that roughly 64% of the gold bars at Fort Knox have a fineness between 899 and 901, 2% have a fineness between 901.1 and 915.4, 17% have a fineness between 915.5 and 917, and 17% have a fineness greater than or equal to 995. The average fineness is 916.7.

Under the currency reforms enacted by Roosevelt, the federal government owns the gold and holds it as security for $11 billion in gold certificates issued, in book-entry form, to the Federal Reserve Banks. The Federal Reserve Banks use these certificates as a small fraction of the collateral for Federal Reserve Notes.

In addition to the gold, the depository currently holds ten 1933 Double Eagle gold coins, a 1974-D aluminum cent, and twelve gold (22-karat) Sacagawea dollar coins that flew on the Space Shuttle.

== Reputation ==
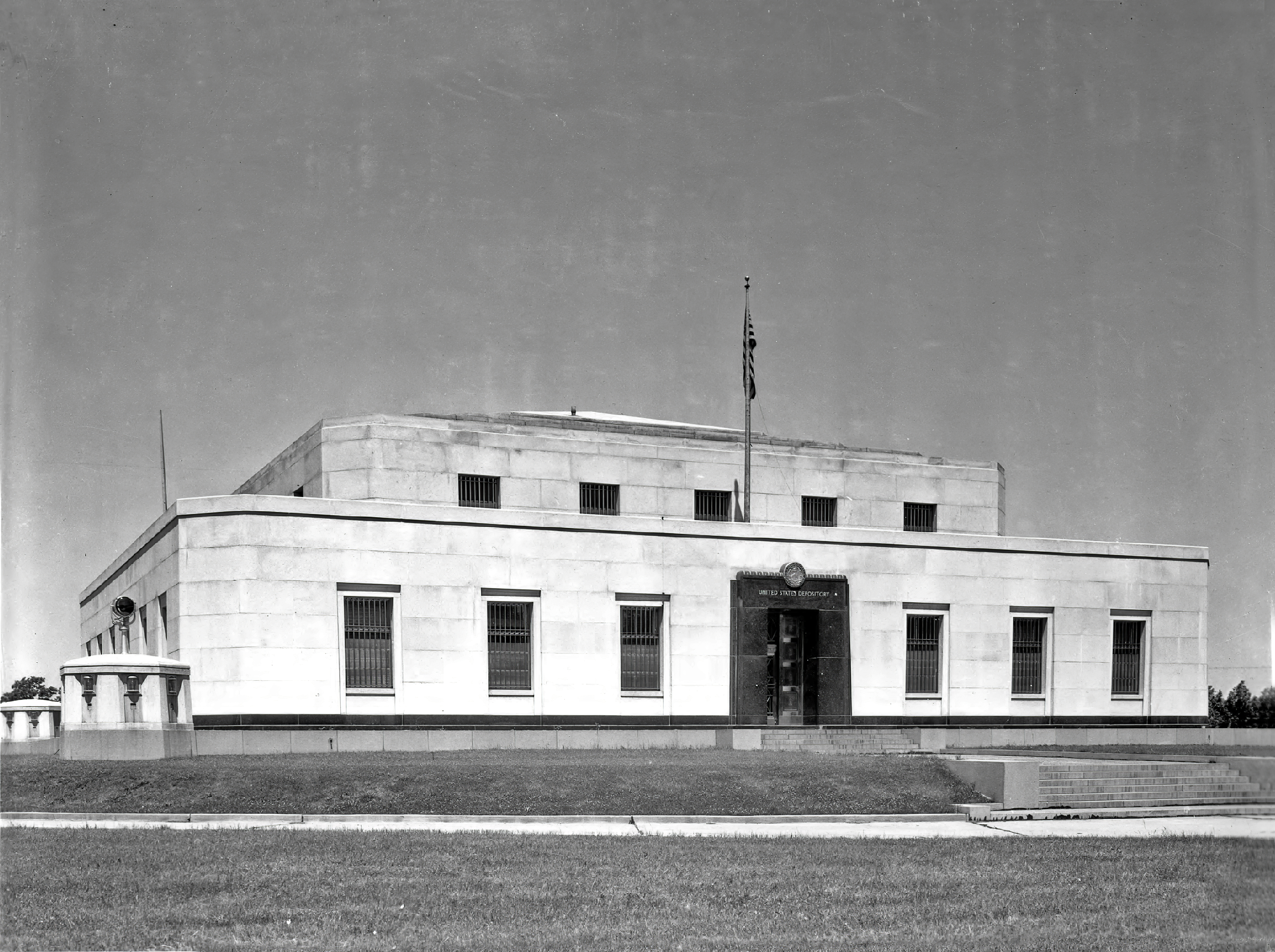
US Bullion Depository. Taken in 1968, four years after the movie Goldfinger

The term "safe as Fort Knox" has become a simile for safety and security in popular vernacular. As an example, 2020 Democratic Party presidential primary candidate Elizabeth Warren, when outlining in a Medium post a plan to make voting machines secure, stated "Our elections should be as secure as Fort Knox. But instead, they're less secure than your Amazon account." Samsung Knox, part of Samsung's SAFE (Samsung For Enterprise) initiative, was named after Fort Knox, connoting a sense of security.

== In popular culture ==
Given its reputation for securely holding large amounts of gold, breaking into the depository has been featured in many popular books, movies, games, and television shows. A well-known example is the 1959 James Bond novel Goldfinger by Ian Fleming, in which the eponymous villain attempts to steal the gold, but in the 1964 film adaptation instead executes a convoluted scheme of irradiating all the gold in the vault in order to drive up the world price. The 1937 film Behind the Headlines, released the same year as the first wave of gold shipments to Fort Knox, was about gangsters stealing gold from an armored car en route to the depository. In the 1951 comedy Comin' Round the Mountain, Abbott and Costello follow a treasure map and unwittingly dig into the vault at Fort Knox, where they are immediately arrested. In the 1952 animated cartoon 14 Carrot Rabbit, Bugs Bunny tricks Yosemite Sam into digging into the vault, where he too is immediately arrested.

== See also ==
- Vaulted gold
- Federal Reserve Bank of New York – the HQ building's gold depository for 36 foreign central banks.
