= 1974 aluminum cent =

Proposed American coin

Cent
- United States
- Value: 0.01 US$
- Mass: 0.937 g (0.030 troy oz)
- Diameter: 19.05 mm (0.750 in)
- Thickness: 1.55 mm (0.061 in)
- Edge: Plain/Smooth
- Composition: 96% Aluminum with trace metals mixed in.
- Years of minting: 1973 (dated 1974), 1974, 1975
- Catalog number: Judd J2151/Pollock P2084 (1974 Aluminum); Judd J2152 (1974 Bronze-Plated Steel); Judd J2153 (1974-D Aluminum); Judd J2155 (1975 Aluminum)

Obverse
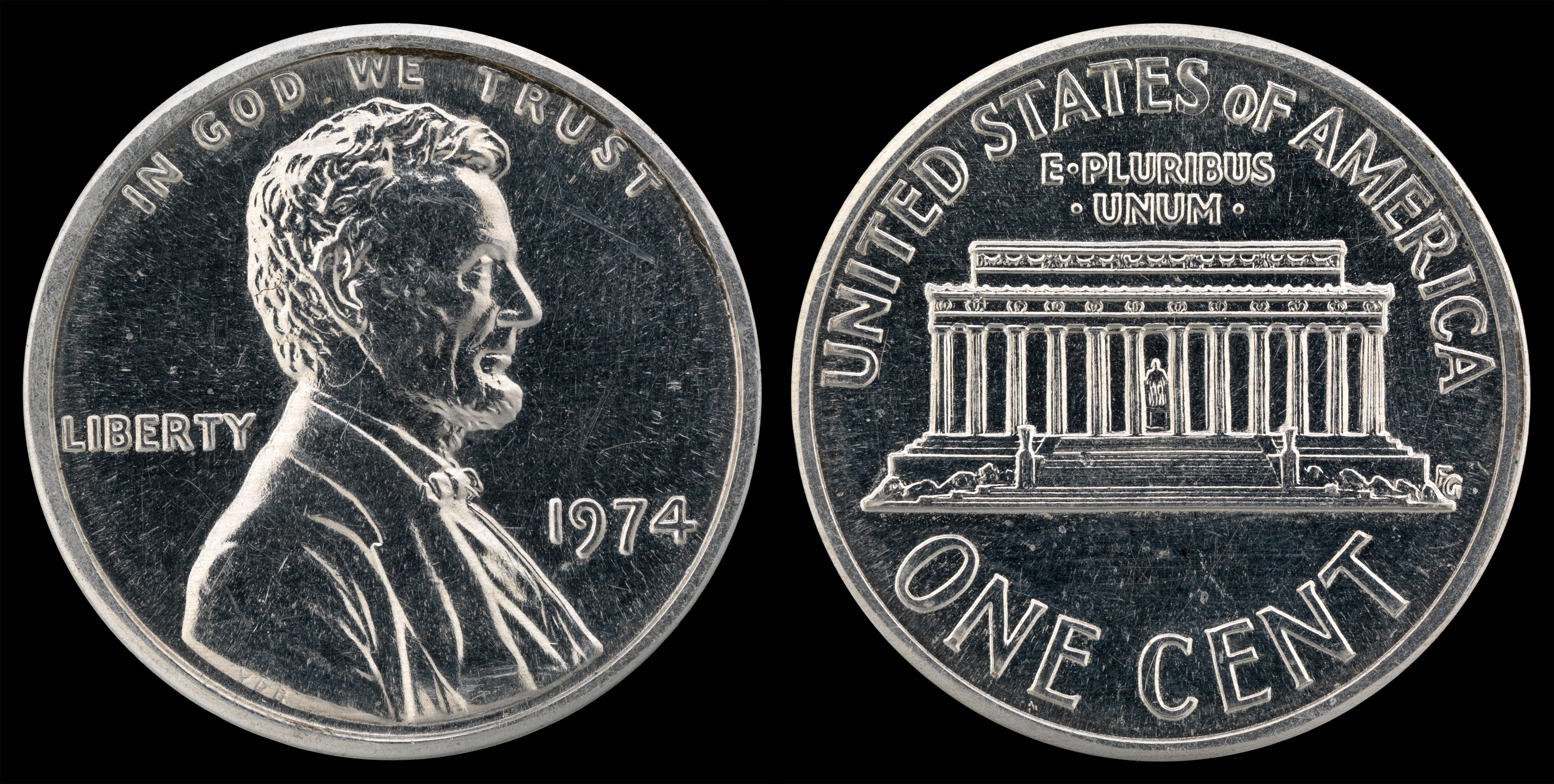
- Design: Abraham Lincoln
- Designer: Victor D. Brenner
- Design date: 1909

Reverse
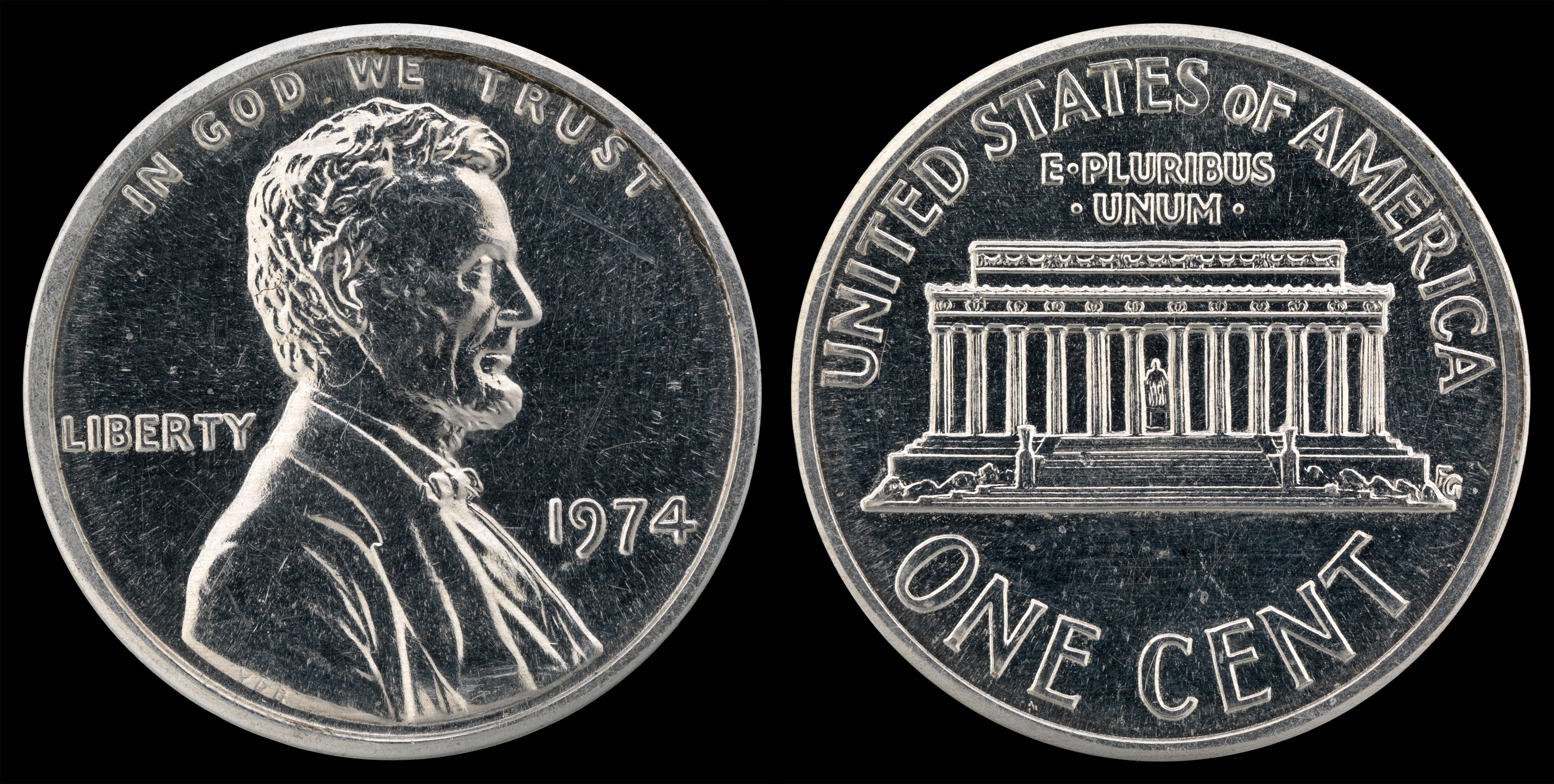
- Design: Lincoln Memorial
- Designer: Frank Gasparro
- Design date: 1959

The 1974 aluminum cent was a one-cent coin proposed by the United States Mint in 1973. It was composed of an alloy of aluminum and trace metals, and it was intended to replace the predominantly copper–zinc cent due to the rising costs of coin production in the traditional bronze alloy. Of the 1,571,167 coins struck in anticipation of release, none were released into circulation. To encourage congressional support for the new alloy, the Mint distributed several examples to U.S. Congressmen. When the proposed aluminum cent was rejected, the Mint recalled and destroyed those coins.

However, despite the recall, a few aluminum cents were not returned to the Mint, and those coins may remain at large. One example was donated to the Smithsonian Institution, while another was alleged to have been found by United States Capitol Police Officer Albert P. Toven. A 1974-D specimen was found in January 2014 by Randall Lawrence, who said it was a retirement gift to his father, Harry Edmond Lawrence, who was Deputy Superintendent at the Denver Mint. Randall planned on selling it in a public auction, but the Mint demanded its return, saying that the coin was never authorized for release and therefore remains U.S. government property. Lawrence (and his business partner at their coin store, Michael McConnell) ultimately surrendered the coin when the Mint showed that the aluminum cent had never been authorized to be struck in Denver, and there was no evidence that the coin had been a gift of any kind.

== History ==
In late 1973, the price of copper on world markets rose to a point where the metallic value of the cent was almost equal to its face value. The US Mint, which produces billions of cents annually, was faced with a potentially catastrophic operating deficit due to issues of seigniorage. As a result, the Mint tested alternate metals, including aluminum and bronze-clad steel. A composition of 96% aluminum (with trace elements for stability) was chosen. The composition was chosen due to its longevity on coin die use and aluminum's high resistance to tarnishing. Although they were produced in 1973, they were struck using 1974 dated dies in anticipation of release into circulation in that year.

In an effort to gain acceptance for the new composition, the Mint distributed approximately three dozen examples to various members of the House Banking and Currency Committee and the Senate Banking, Housing, and Urban Affairs Committee. Nine congressmen and four senators received examples, along with some Treasury officials. Additional specimens were given out by then Mint Director Mary Brooks. Ultimately, the proposal was rejected in Congress, due mainly to the efforts of the copper-mining and vending machine industries, which felt the aluminum coins would jam machines and cause other mechanical problems. Opposition also came from pediatricians and pediatric radiologists who pointed out if children ingested the aluminum pennies, they would be difficult to detect using X-ray imaging because the radiodensity of the metal inside the respiratory and gastrointestinal tracts was similar to that of soft tissue. In addition, the price of copper declined enough that making copper cents would again be economically viable and, conversely, made hoarding pointless. The idea of changing the cent's composition was not explored again until the 1980s, when, in 1982, the composition of the coin was changed to the current 99.2% zinc and 0.8% copper core alloy with a plating of pure copper, resulting in a 20% weight reduction.

After the setback, the US Mint recalled the coins, but about 12 to 14 aluminum cents were never returned to the mint. No oversight, record keeping, or statement that the coins had to be returned was made by the US Mint as examples were handed out. When the Federal Bureau of Investigation and other government law enforcement agencies were called in to investigate, however, some congressmen either feigned ignorance or completely denied getting examples. The coins, which are considered government property, have been subject to seizure by the Secret Service, although the legality of the cent is questioned by numismatists. One aluminum cent was donated to the Smithsonian Institution for the National Numismatic Collection. Since no examples have been put up for public or known private sale, it has been difficult to estimate their value.

While there are no Mint records of the 1974-D aluminum cent being struck at the Denver Mint, in an interview with Coin World, Benito Martinez, a die setter at the Denver Mint in 1974, stated he struck fewer than 12 of the experimental 1974-D Lincoln cents under the supervision of Harry Bobay, a Denver Mint production foreman. The strikes were made using regular production dies on aluminum blanks supplied from the Philadelphia Mint.

The coin is considered by a few numismatists not as a pattern coin, but rather a rejected or canceled regular issue, despite being listed in pattern books.

== Toven Specimen ==
In the February 20, 2001, edition of Numismatic News, Alan Herbert reported the existence of an aluminum cent. It was attributed to US Capitol Police Officer Albert Toven, who had found the coin dropped by an unnamed US Congressman on the floor of the Rayburn Office Building. When the officer attempted to return the coin to the congressman, thinking it was a dime, the congressman told him to keep it. This example was graded and certified by the Independent Coin Grading Company as "About Uncirculated-58" in 2005, but later certified as Mint State 62 two months later by the Professional Coin Grading Service.

== Lawrence Specimen ==
In January 2014, San Diego resident Randy Lawrence discovered a 1974-D aluminum cent. The coin had been in the possession of his father, Harry Edmond Lawrence, a former deputy superintendent of the Denver Mint, who kept it in a sandwich bag along with other coins. Lawrence brought the coin to La Jolla coin dealer Michael McConnell, who estimated its value at a minimum of US$250,000, up to $2 million or possibly more. On January 28, 2014, PCGS announced that it had certified the coin as authentic with the grade PCGS MS63 and certification number 28544237. Lawrence and McConnell planned to auction the coin in April 2014 after it toured the United States and split the proceeds; Lawrence planned to donate as much as $100,000 of his share to homeless programs. However, the coin had to be withdrawn from the auction pending the outcome of a request by the United States Mint to return the coin. The case proceeded after Judge William Q. Hayes denied the government's motion to dismiss on March 26, 2015, stating: "it is plausible that a Mint official, with proper authority and in an authorized manner, allowed Harry Lawrence to keep the 1974-D aluminum cent. Drawing reasonable inferences, it is plausible that Harry Lawrence lawfully obtained possession of the aluminum cent, giving Plaintiffs superior claim of title to the aluminum cent." On March 17, 2016, Lawrence and McConnell surrendered the penny to the US Mint to settle the terms of their lawsuit which was dropped. The Mint has reported their intention to display the penny as a part of US Mint history. A 1974-D is stored at the United States Bullion Depository.

== Other examples ==
Several other related examples are alleged to have existed at some point or another, including

- 10 examples of a 1974-D aluminum cent, produced at the Denver Mint. Unlike the Philadelphia aluminum cent, these were actually minted in 1974.
- Examples produced in bronze-clad steel.
- 66 aluminum cents made in 1975 as trial strikings.
- At least 1 example of an aluminum Lincoln Wheat cent struck in 1942 to test a possible alternative composition to bronze for the following year. Unlike the 1974–75 aluminum cents, this coin appears to be legal to possess and was sold at Heritage Auctions in May 2009.
- Trial strikings of various compositions.
