= 1943 steel cent =

U.S. currency

Cent
- United States
- Value: $0.01 U.S. dollars
- Mass: 2.702 g
- Diameter: 19.05 mm
- Thickness: 1.55 mm
- Edge: Plain
- Composition: 99% steel with a thin layer of zinc
- Years of minting: 1943

Obverse
- Design: Abraham Lincoln
- Designer: Victor D. Brenner
- Design date: 1909

Reverse
- Design: Wheat Heads in memoria
- Designer: Victor D. Brenner
- Design date: 1909

1943 steel cents are U.S. one-cent coins that were struck in steel due to wartime shortages of copper. The Philadelphia, Denver, and San Francisco mints each produced these 1943 Lincoln cents. The unique composition of the coin (low-grade steel coated with zinc, instead of the previously 95%-copper-based bronze composition) has led to various nicknames, such as wartime cent, steel war penny, zinc cent and steelie. The 1943 steel cent features the same Victor David Brenner design for the Lincoln cent which had been in use since 1909.

== History ==
Due to wartime needs of copper for use in ammunition and other military equipment during World War II, the United States Mint researched various ways to limit dependence and meet conservation goals on copper usage. After trying out several substitutes (ranging from other metals to plastics) to replace the then-standard bronze alloy, the one-cent coin was minted in zinc-coated steel. This alloy caused the new coins to be magnetic and 13% lighter. They were struck at all three mints: Philadelphia, Denver, and San Francisco. As with the bronze cents, coins from the latter two sites have respectively "D" and "S" mintmarks below the date.

=== Problems in circulation ===
However, problems began to arise from the mintage. Freshly minted, they were often mistaken for dimes, leading to identification issues among individuals with poor vision. Magnets in vending machines (which took copper cents) placed to pick up steel slugs also picked up the legitimate steel cents. Rust also became an issue: While the steel sheets from which the new penny blanks were punched were galvanized, the process of punching the blanks cut through the zinc layer, leaving the edges of the coins unprotected. Simply carrying a steel penny in one's pocket while perspiring on a hot day often led to quick rusting.

A rusted steel penny

After public outcry, the Mint developed a process whereby salvaged brass shell casings were augmented with pure copper to produce an alloy close to the 1941–42 composition. This was used for cents dated 1944 through 1946, after which the prewar composition was resumed. Although they continued to circulate into the 1960s, the mint collected large numbers of the 1943 cents and destroyed them.

=== Legacy ===
The steel cent is the only regular-issue United States coin that can be picked up with a magnet. The steel cent was also the only coin issued by the United States for circulation that does not contain any copper. (Even U.S. gold coins at various times contained from slightly over 2% copper to an eventual standard 10% copper to increase resistance to wear by making the pure gold coins slightly harder).

== Related variations ==
=== 1943 copper cent ===
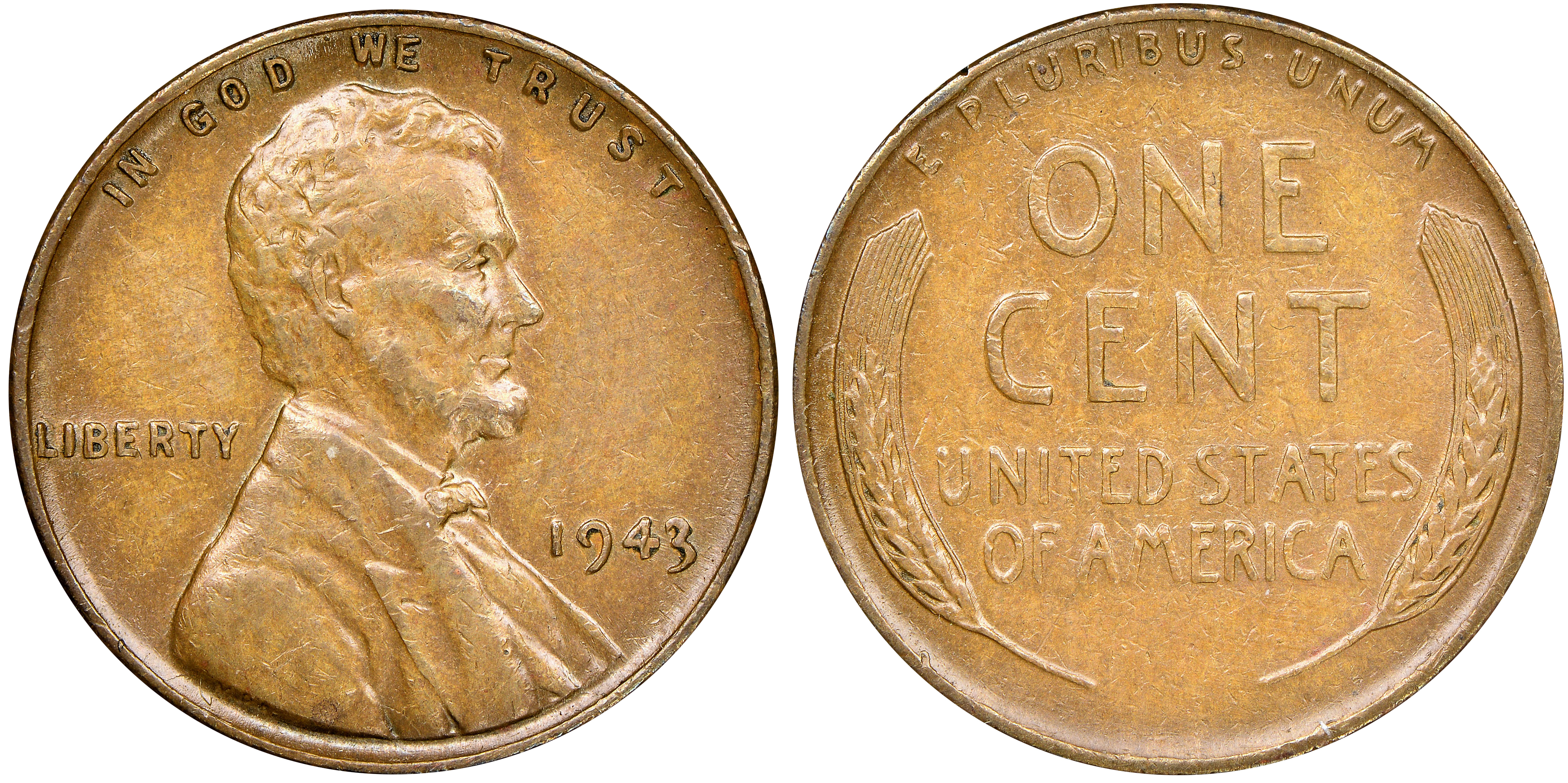
1943 copper cent

Far ahead of the 1955 doubled die cent in rarity, the 1943 copper cent is one of the notable rarities of the Lincoln cent series. An estimated 40 examples are believed to have been struck, with 27 confirmed to exist and 20 sold. The error occurred when copper planchets were left in the press hopper and press machines during the changeover from copper to steel blanks. Examples were discovered after the War, with the first two in 1947, and another in 1958. That example appeared in a 1958 Abe Kosoff sale, but was withdrawn prior to the sale; one mint condition Denver Mint specimen sold for over $1.7 million in 2010. The latest sold in 2019 for $204,000.

==== Counterfeits ====
Many people have counterfeited the coin by either copper-plating normal 1943 cents (sometimes as novelties with no intent to defraud), or altering cents from the period, usually 1945, 1948, or 1949-dated coins.

The copper cents differ from their steel counterparts in four ways:

- Genuine 1943 copper cents will not be attracted to a magnet. Copper-plated steel cents will exhibit a strong magnetic attraction.
- Copper cents weigh 3.11 grams. Steel cents weigh 2.702 grams.
- The numeral 3 in 1943 has the same long tail as the steel cents. Alterations from later-dated copper cents will be noticeable when compared side by side with genuine cents with years ending in 3.
- The quality of the strike is exceptionally sharp, especially around the rim, because the soft copper planchets were struck with the same (higher) pressure used for the steel cents.

=== 1943 tin cent ===
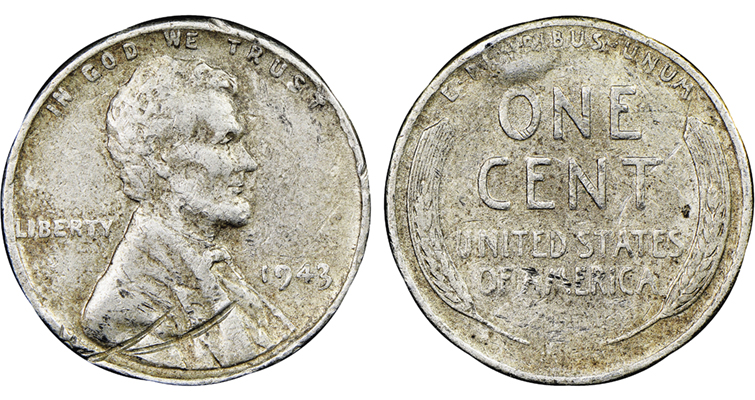
1943 tin cent

1943 tin cent composition
Tin	86.41%
Antimony	8.37%
Copper	1.75%
Vanadium	1.02%

In 2019, NGC authenticated a worn 1943 cent composed of 86.41% tin and 8.37% antimony with other trace metals. The coin was discovered by a coin collector in the state of Oregon, who found it in his father's yard around 1969, and realized it was not attracted to a magnet while searching his coin collection for 1943 copper cents in 2019. The coin is likely an error or was intentionally struck as a pattern in late 1942 using an obverse die intended for the following year, though no documented evidence of a pattern with this composition has been found.

The coin was found in a badly damaged state, with two large gashes and a slight bend. Believing it to be a steel cent, the discoverer straightened the coin in a bench vise so that it would fit inside a coin album. The coin weighs 2.702 g.

=== 1944 steel cent ===
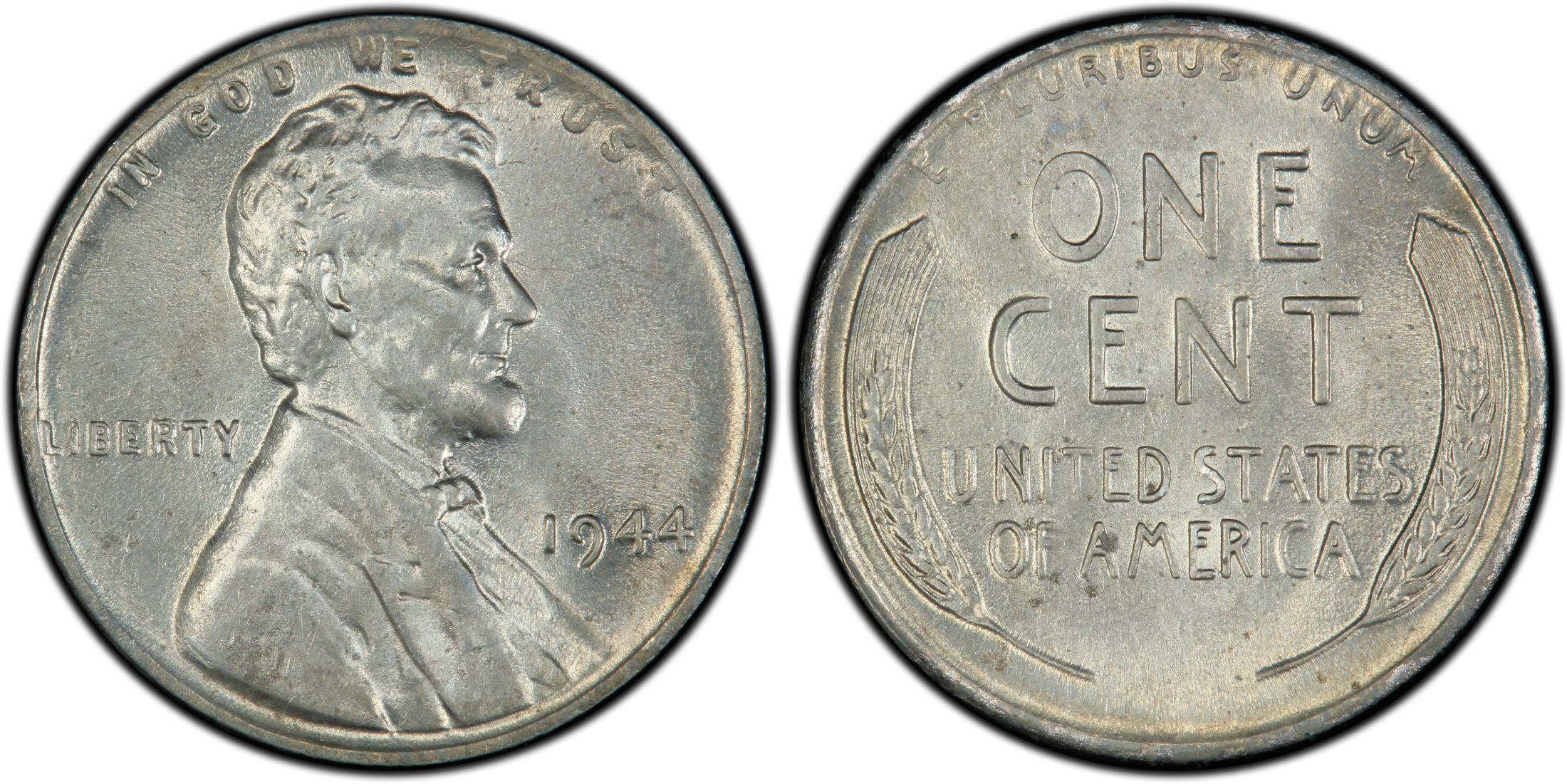
1944 steel cent

In an error similar to the 1943 cents, a few 1944 cents were struck on steel planchets left over from 1943. Two explanations are given for why this happened. One is that steel planchets were left in the press hopper and press machines from the previous year mixed in with copper planchets. Another explanation credits the error to the production of 25 million Belgian two-franc pieces by the Philadelphia mint after that country's liberation from the Nazis. These coins were of the same composition and the same planchets as the 1943 cents, but they differed slightly in weight. In all, 1944 steel cents are fewer in number than their 1943 copper counterparts, and are even more valuable; one such example minted in San Francisco sold for $373,750 in an August 2008 auction held by Heritage Auctions; this was the highest auction price ever for a Lincoln cent until September 23, 2010, when it was superseded by a 1943-D bronze penny.

== Cost of mintage ==
Although United States penny is widely known to hold a higher mintage cost than its face value, the United States actually made a large profit on minting steel coins. In 1943, the cost of a gross ton of steel was $34.

== Novelty coins ==
Since many steel cents corroded and became dull soon after entering circulation, some dealers who sold the coins as novelties improved their appearance by "reprocessing" – stripping off the old zinc coating and then replating them with zinc or chrome. These reprocessed coins are sometimes erroneously described as "brilliant uncirculated", or similar terms, by ignorant or unscrupulous online sellers.

== See also ==
- War nickels, 1942–1945 Jefferson nickels produced with 35% silver instead of nickel, due to nickel requirements by the U.S. military
- Sales tax token
