= Sales tax token =

Type of token used to pay sales tax

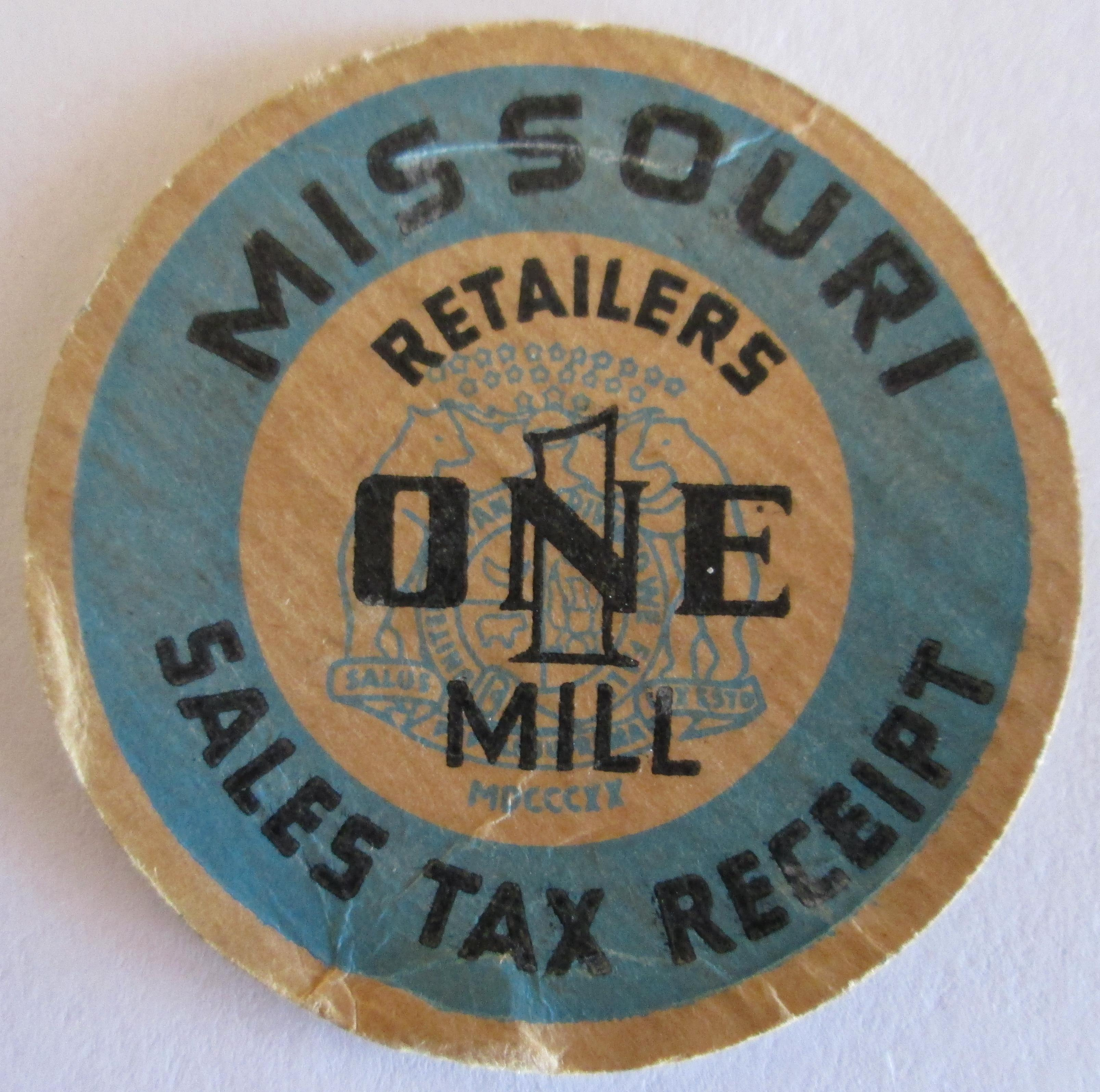
A 1935 Missouri 1 mill token, known in slang as a "milk top" owing to its similarity to milk bottle caps of the era.

Sales tax tokens are fractional cent devices that were used to pay sales tax on very small purchases in many American states during the years of the Great Depression. They were created as a means for consumers to avoid being "overcharged" by having to pay a full penny tax on purchases of 5 or 10 cents. Issued by private firms, by municipalities, and by twelve state governments, sales tax tokens were generally issued in multiples of 1 mill (1/10 cent).

== History ==
=== Background ===
Though excise taxes were commonly used, the first statewide general sales tax in the United States was enacted in West Virginia in 1921, a 1% tax replacing corporate income tax. Georgia enacted a sales tax in 1929. Amidst spiking need for social services, skyrocketing unemployment, and increased property tax defaults during the Great Depression, in 1933, sales taxes were enacted in 11 more states, including New York, Illinois, California, and Michigan.

=== Launch of sales tax tokens ===
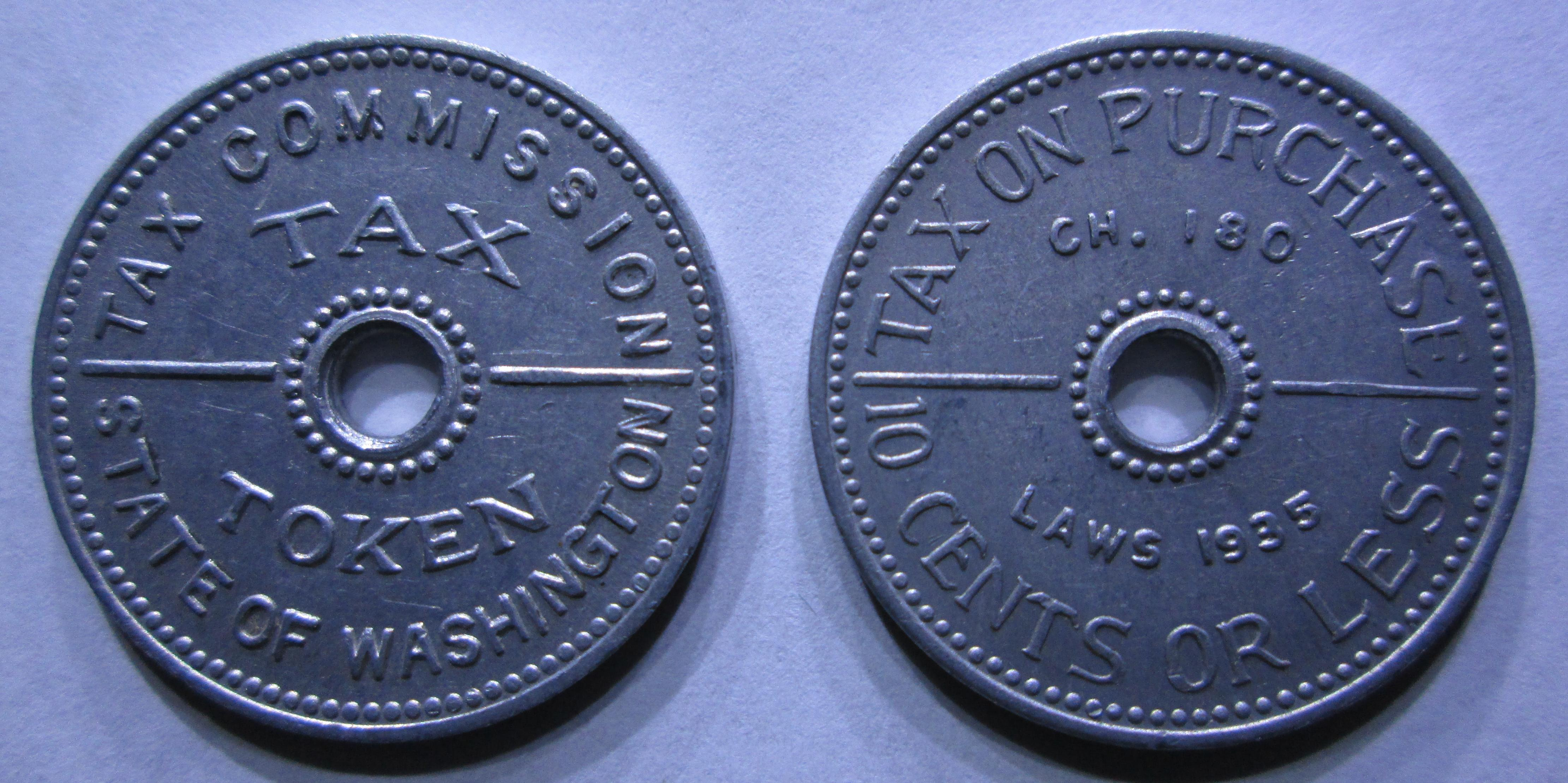
An aluminum sales tax token from the state of Washington, valued at 2 mills (1/5 cent) and good for the "tax on purchase of 10 cents or less" under the state's 2% retail sales tax law.

The twelve states that issued these sales tax tokens were Alabama, Arizona, Colorado, Illinois, Kansas, Louisiana, Mississippi, Missouri, New Mexico, Oklahoma, Utah, and Washington.

In addition to the fractional cent tokens used elsewhere, a closely related system of state-issued paper sales tax stamps and punch cards was used in the state of Ohio.

Sales tax tokens were generally regarded as a nuisance by consumers and were replaced in fairly short order by the bracket system of sales tax collection, which averaged out the tax on small sales. By the end of the 1930s token use was eliminated in most of the issuing states, with sales tax tokens lingering in Missouri until late in the 1940s.

=== Collectibility ===
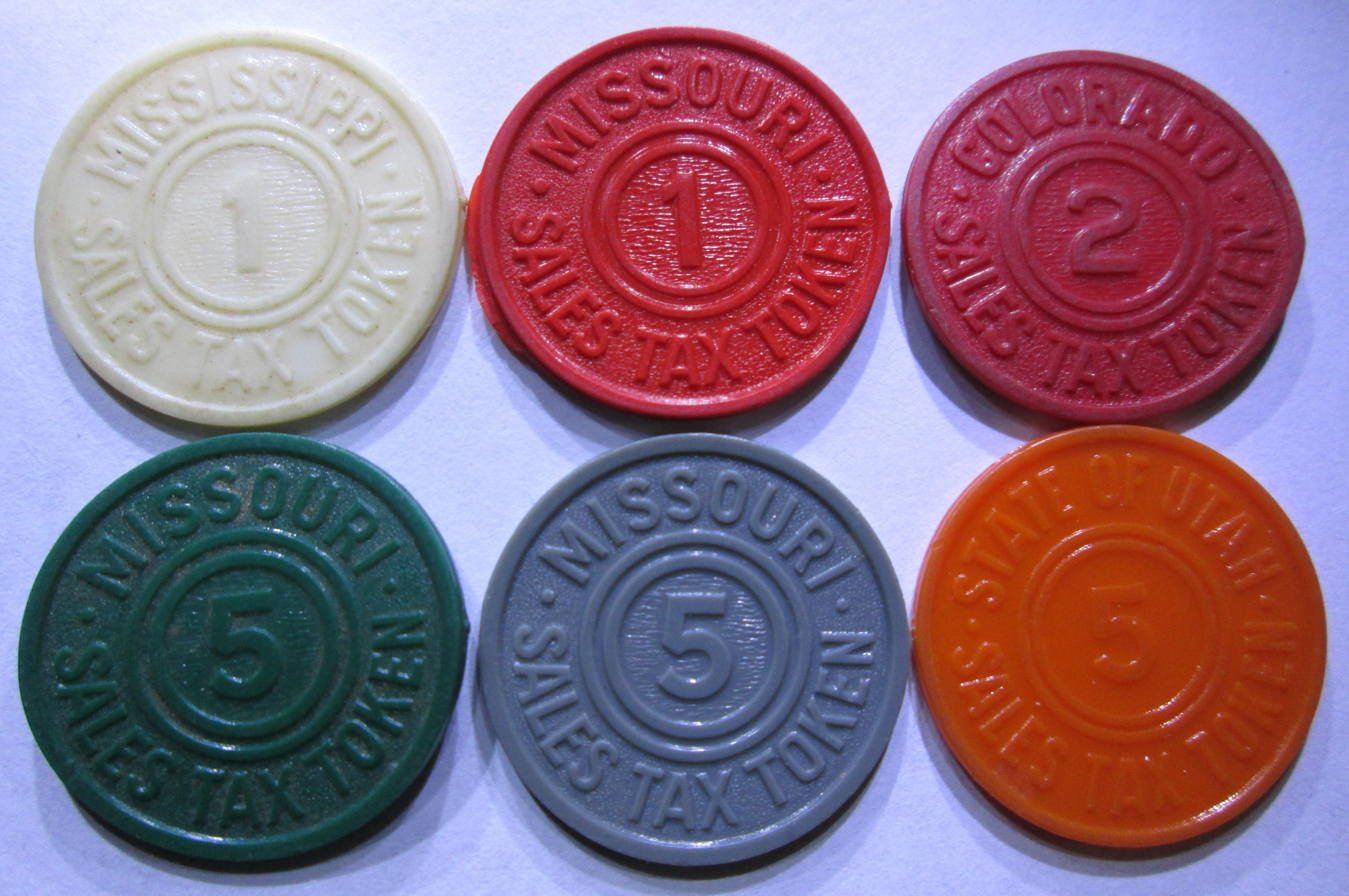
A number of states issued colorful plastic tax tokens made in quantities running into hundreds of millions. The denominations on the token are numbers of "mills" (tenths of one cent).

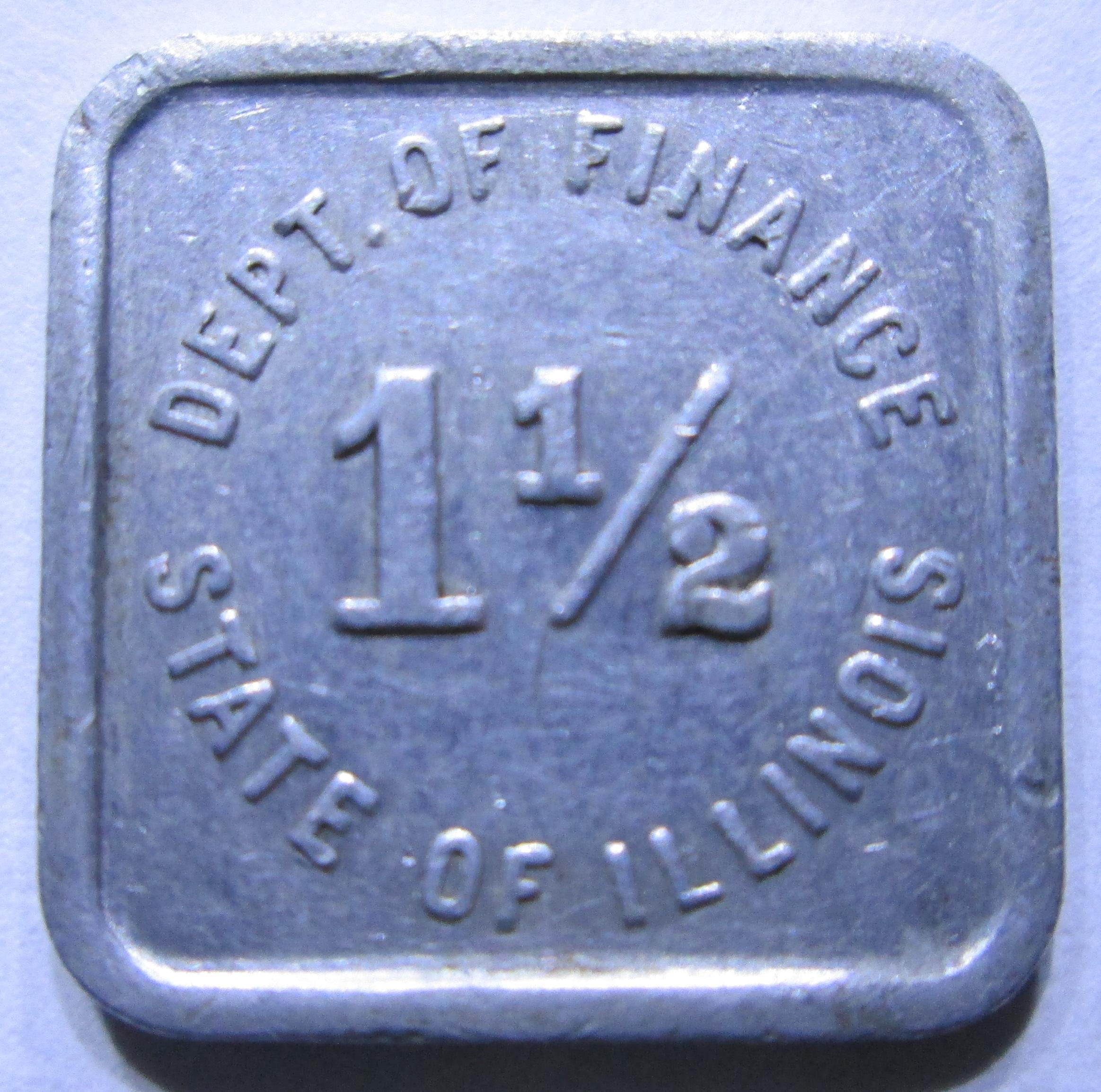
Square-shaped Illinois sales tax token

Tax tokens were issued in a variety of materials, including cardboard, brass, bronze, aluminum, pressed cotton fiber, and plastic. The number of types issued is counted in the hundreds, with mintages of some of these types ranging upwards into the tens of millions. Consequently, tax tokens are regarded by numismatists as ubiquitous and often are of comparatively little value. On the other hand, certain types and varieties are extremely rare, with as few as one specimen known.

In 1971 collectors of sales tax tokens founded an organization called the American Tax Token Society, which has published a quarterly newsletter continuously since its foundation.

=== Catalogs ===
In addition to a number of early check-lists of available tokens, there have been two comprehensive catalogs published for collectors of sales tax tokens. The first of these, Chits, Chiselers, and Funny Money, by Michael G. Pfefferkorn and Jerry F. Schimmel, was published in 1977 with a press run of just 500 copies. A small number of bootleg copies were later photocopied and spiral-ring bound.

The Pfefferkorn and Schimmel catalog was superseded in 1993 with the publication of United States Tax Tokens and Stamps: A History and Catalog, by Merlin K. Malehorn and Tim Davenport. The book is colloquially known among collectors as “the M&D" based upon the surnames of the authors and the so-called "M&D" numbering system of that book remains in common use by tax token specialist collectors. Additional types and varieties discovered after publication of this latter book, complete with "pseudo-M&D" numbers, have been described and illustrated in various issues of ATTS Newsletter.

Historical coverage in this latter book was supplemented in 2013 with the publication of Monte Dean's Sales Tax Tokens and Scrip: Histories, a massive one million word tome reproducing nearly 3,600 newspaper articles and monograph excerpts.

== See also ==
- Hard times token
