= United States Mint Police =

United States federal law enforcement agency

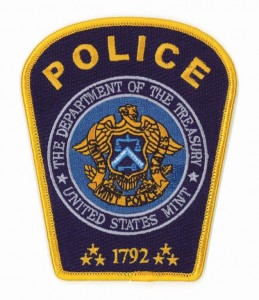
- Patch of the U.S. Mint Police

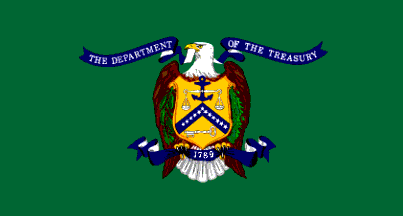
- Flag of the U.S. Department of the Treasury
- Common name: Mint Police

Agency overview
- Formed: 1792

Jurisdictional structure
- Federal agency: United States
- Operations jurisdiction: United States
- General nature: Federal law enforcement; Civilian police

Operational structure
- Headquarters: Washington, D.C.
- Agency executive: John P. Brawdy, Acting Chief
- Parent agency: United States Mint
- Offices: 6: United States Mint Headquarters, Washington, D.C.; United States Mint at Philadelphia, Pennsylvania; United States Mint at Denver, Colorado; United States Mint at San Francisco, California; United States Mint at West Point, New York; United States Bullion Depository, Fort Knox, Kentucky

Website
- usmint.gov

The United States Mint Police is a U.S. federal law enforcement agency responsible for the protection of the facilities, assets, and personnel of the U.S. Mint. It was founded in 1792, making it among the oldest federal law enforcement agencies in the United States.

In 2004, the United States Mint Police employed 376 police officers across the country.

== Law enforcement duties ==
Mint police officers are required to successfully pass the Uniform Police Training Program at the Federal Law Enforcement Training Center at either Glynco, Georgia, or Artesia, New Mexico, for 13 weeks and complete a 5-week field training program.

The United States Mint Police is responsible for protecting over $100 billion in Treasury and other government assets stored in U.S. Mint facilities. The United States Mint Police also safeguards over 2,800 U.S. Mint employees.

In addition, the United States Mint Police have guarded the U.S. Constitution; the Gettysburg Address; and from World War II to 1978, the Holy Crown of Hungary. Its scope has increased over the years, and it now trains with local law enforcement and has bicycle patrols throughout cities across the United States.

In the past, the Mint Police have "participated in security details at a variety of non-Mint-related events, including two presidential inaugurations, the Kentucky Derby, 2002 Winter Olympics in Salt Lake City, and an International Monetary Fund/World Bank Conference." It also assisted with Hurricane Katrina, protecting the New Orleans branch of the Federal Reserve Bank of Atlanta and participating in relief efforts.

== Organization ==
Title	Insignia
Chief	
Deputy Chief	
Commander	
Field Chief	
Inspector	
Lieutenant	
Sergeant	
Detective	No insignia
Police Officer	No insignia

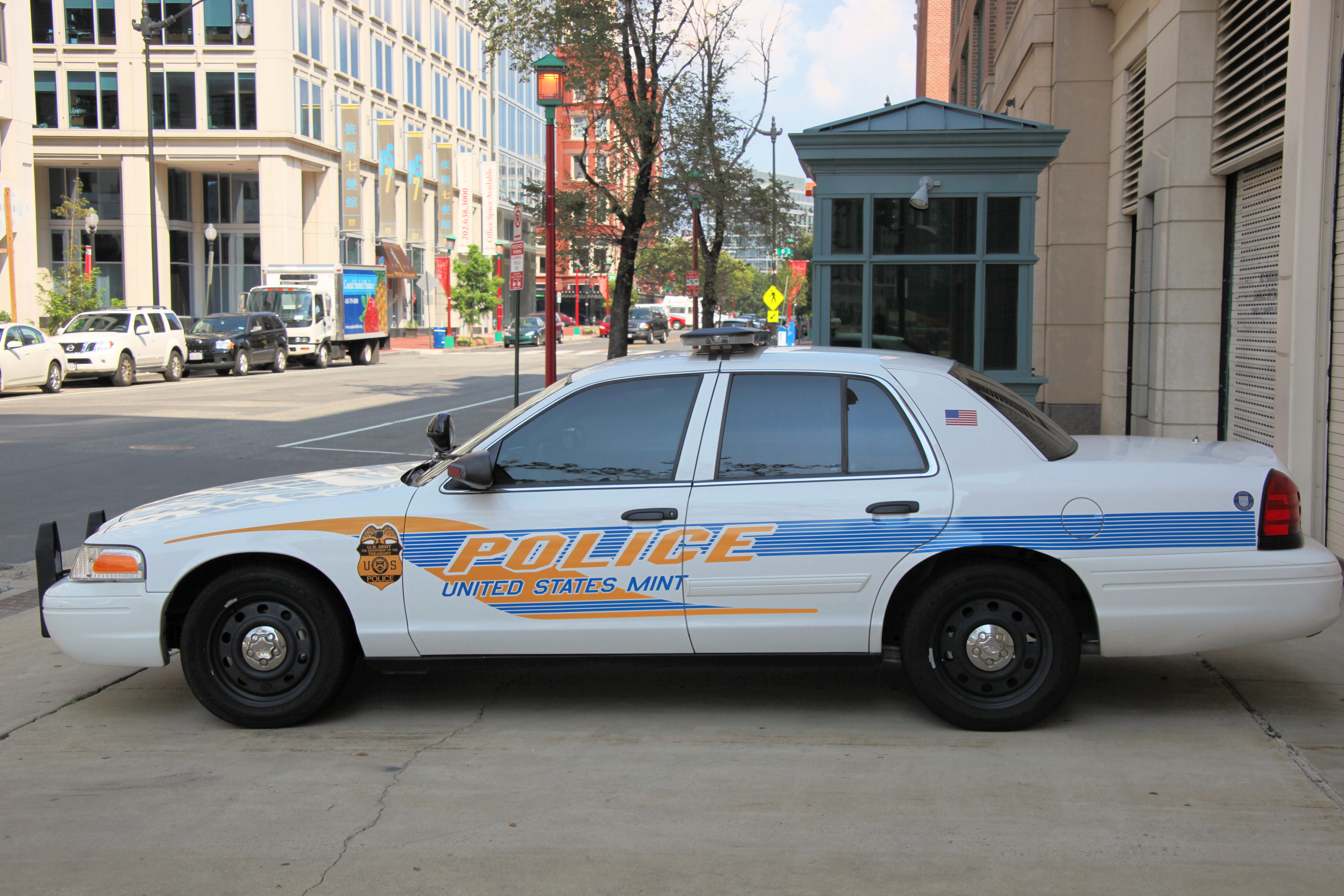
United States Mint Police - CVPI

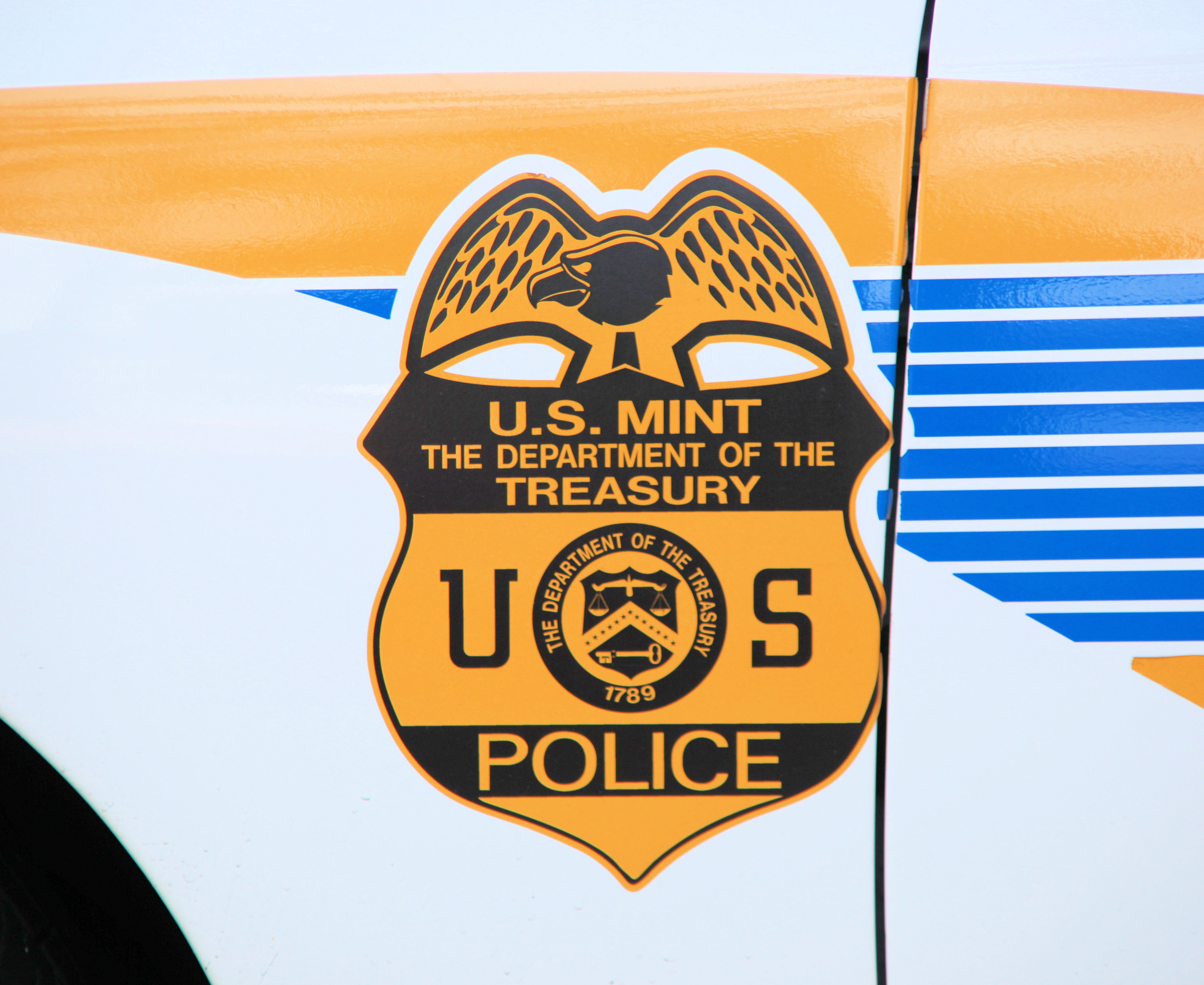
United States Mint Police badge displayed on patrol unit

== Equipment ==
As federal law enforcement, the United States Mint Police carry firearms and a variety of police equipment, including batons, handcuffs, radios and pepper spray.

The United States Mint Police also employ vehicular patrols, using marked and unmarked police vehicles.

== Duty postings ==
The United States Mint Police are stationed at a variety of United States Mint locations including:

- Philadelphia, Pennsylvania
- San Francisco, California
- West Point, New York
- Denver, Colorado
- Fort Knox, Kentucky
- Washington, District of Columbia

== Fallen members ==
Since the establishment of the United States Mint Police, one officer has died in the line of duty.

Officer	Date of death	Details
Police Officer Ted Marvin Shinault	September 20, 2005	Motorcycle accident

== See also ==
- List of United States federal law enforcement agencies
- Federal Reserve Police
- United States Secret Service
