= Auburn Button Works and Logan Silk Mills =

- U.S. National Register of Historic Places
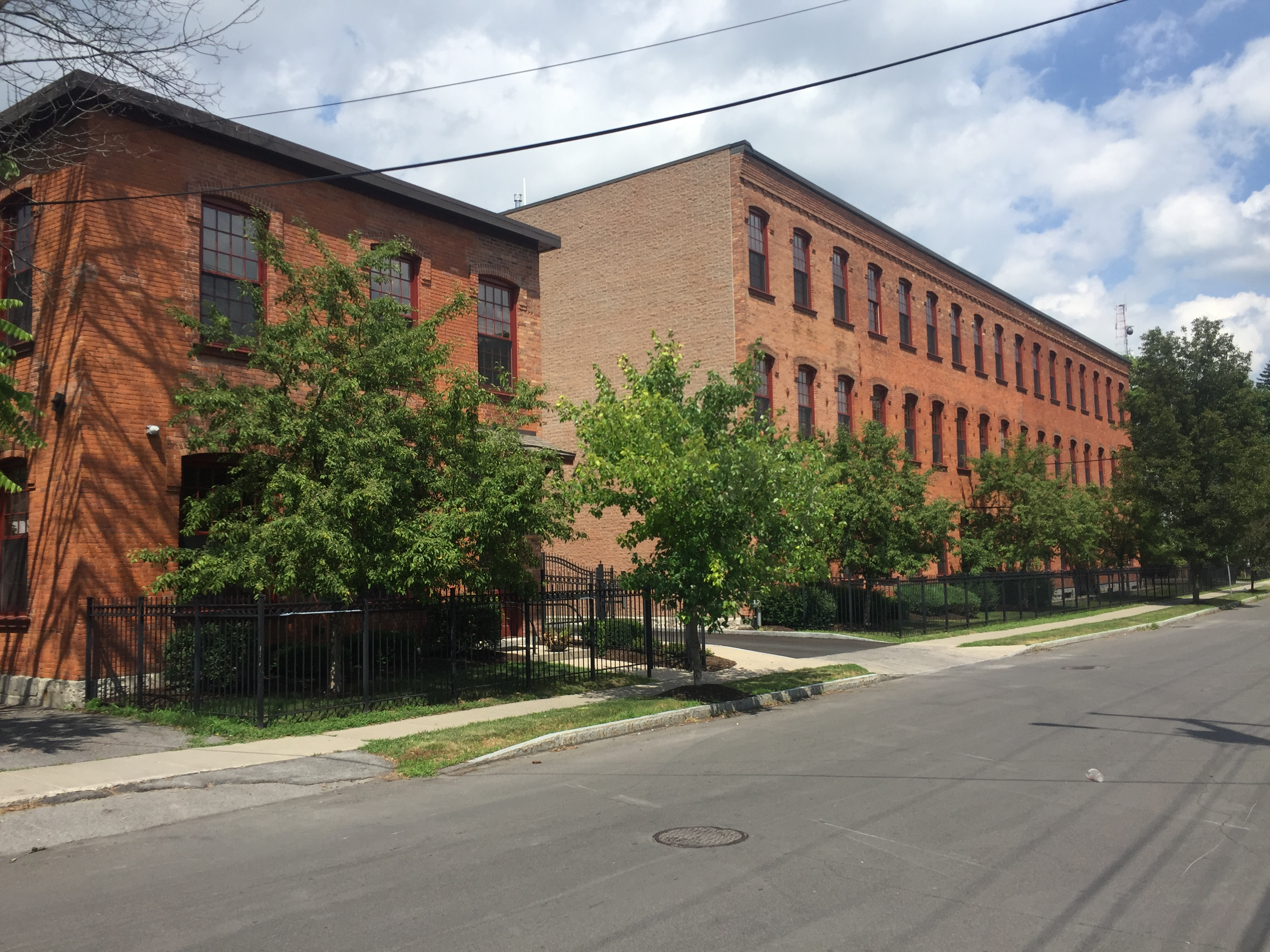

- Location within New York Location within the United States
- Location: 9-11 Logan St., Auburn, New York
- Coordinates: 42.92774°N 76.56445°W
- Area: 1.5 acres (0.61 ha)
- Built: 1879
- Architectural style: Italianate
- NRHP reference No.: 07001014
- Added to NRHP: September 28, 2007

Auburn Button Works and Logan Silk Mills is a historic factory complex located at Auburn in Cayuga County, New York. It is a vernacular Italianate style industrial building built in 1879–1880 to house the Auburn Button Works and Logan Silk Mills. The complex has three parts: a three-story, rectangular main block; a two-story, rectangular west wing; and three story rectangular east wing. It is built of brick on a stone foundation.

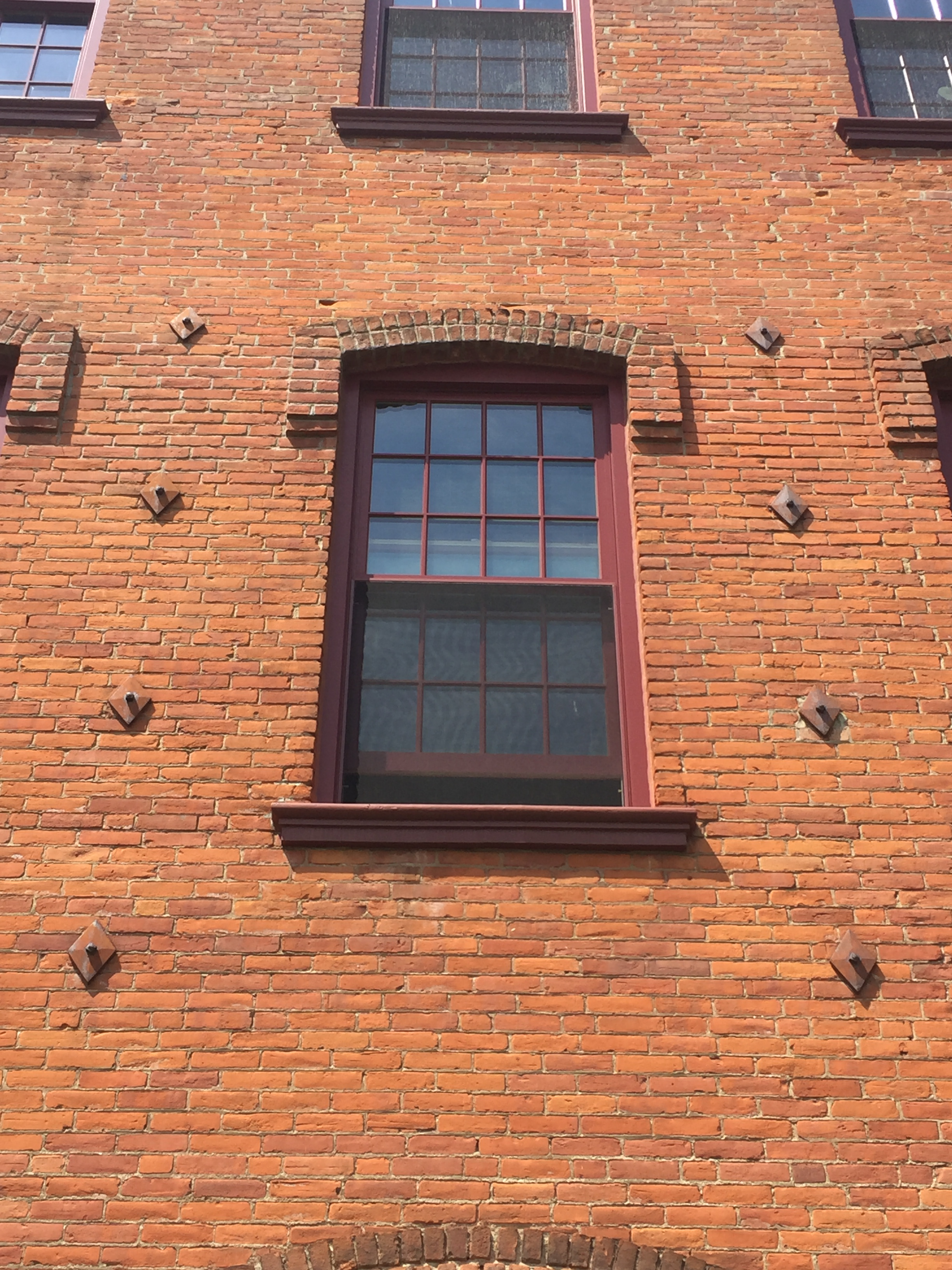
Detail of iron cap jobbers retaining back bricks, and window

Logan Silk Mills was famous for providing the silk for the gown of the First Lady Caroline Harrison wore when her husband, Benjamin Harrison, was inaugurated the 23rd President of the United States in 1889. The Logan Silk Mills went out of business the following year and the space was occupied by the Wegman Piano Company. The Auburn Button Works remained in the complex until about 1900. A fire swept through the west wing on May 1, 1914, and destroyed the third floor. The complex was used as manufacturing space for automobile and mill supplies, shoes, marine hardware, and has also provided warehouse space.

It was listed on the National Register of Historic Places in 2007.
