= 1893-S Morgan dollar =

Key date in the Morgan dollar series

Morgan dollar
- United States
- Value: One dollar
- Mass: (412 1/2 gr)
- Diameter: (1.5 in)
- Thickness: (0.09 in)
- Edge: Reeding
- Composition: 90.0% Silver; 10.0% Copper
- Years of minting: 1893–1893
- Mint marks: San Francisco
- Circulation: 100,000

Obverse
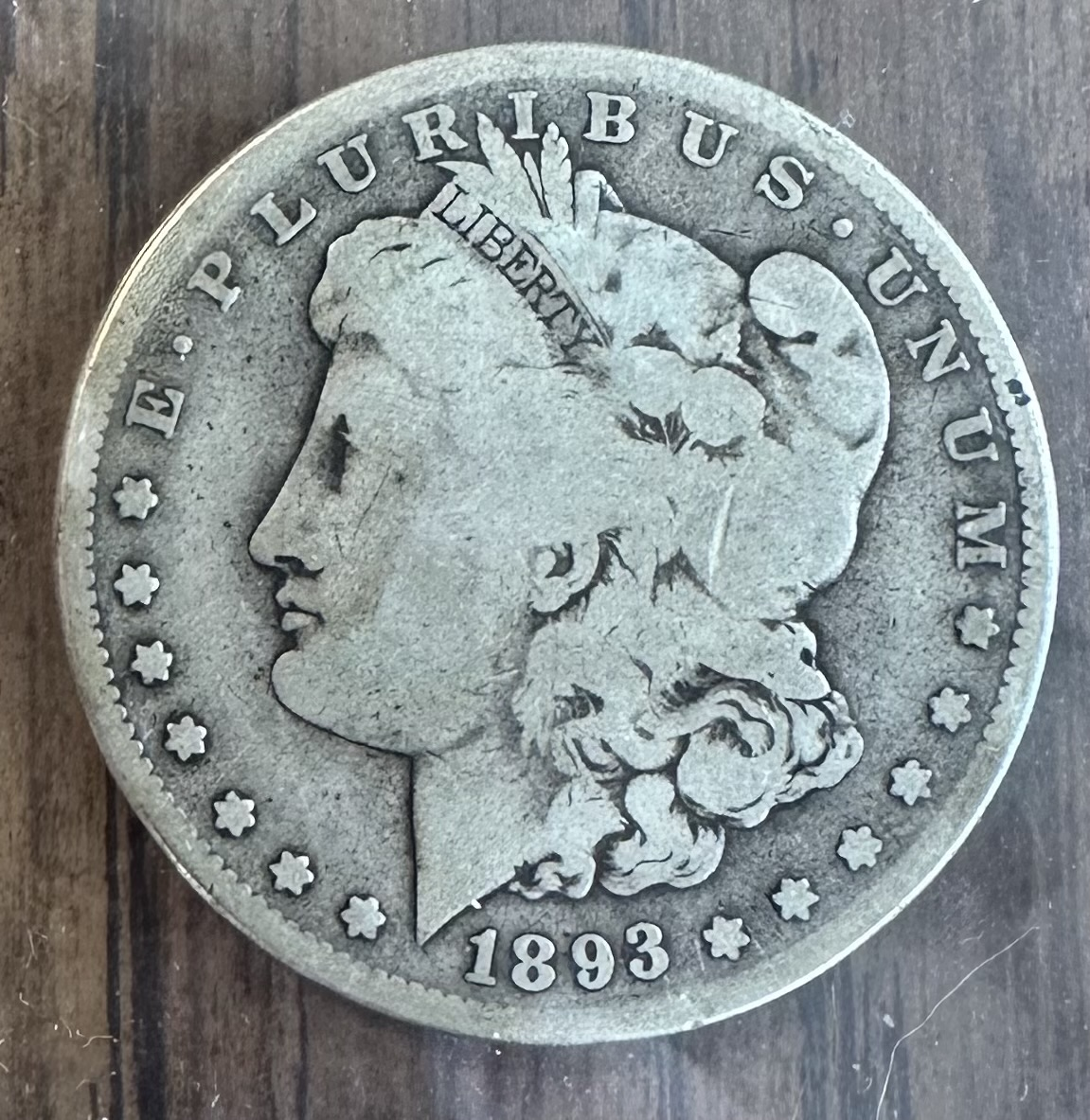
- Design: Liberty
- Designer: George T. Morgan
- Design date: 1878

Reverse
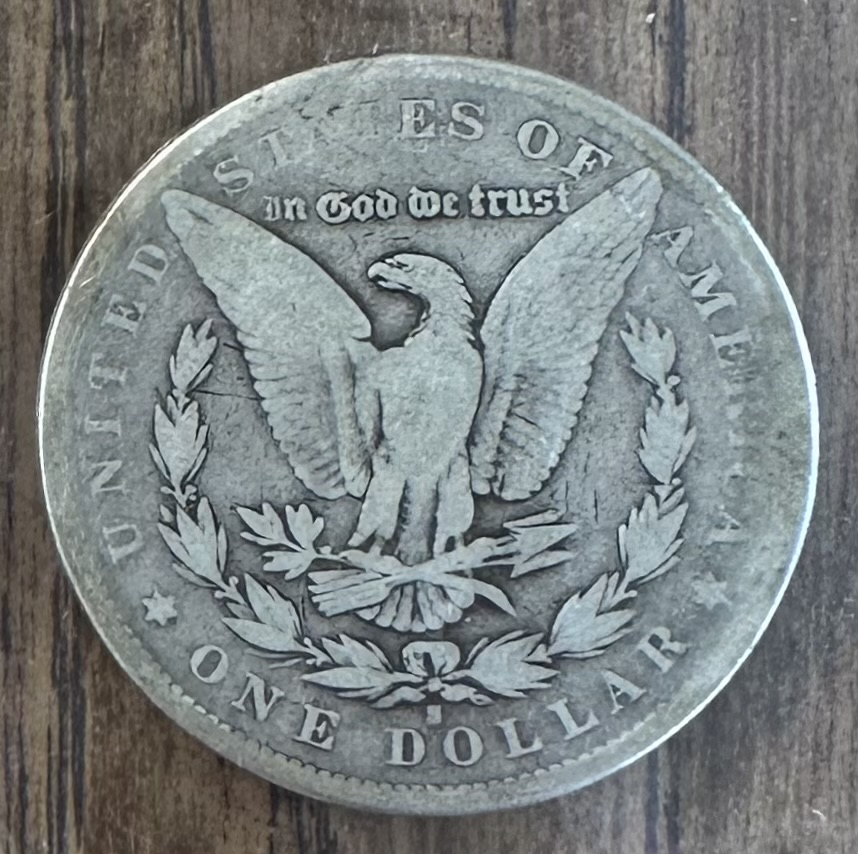
- Design: Eagle clasping arrows and olive branch
- Designer: George T. Morgan
- Design date: 1878

The 1893-S Morgan dollar is a United States dollar coin struck in 1893 at the San Francisco Mint. It is the lowest mintage business strike Morgan dollar in the series. The 1893-S is considered to be a key date in the Morgan dollar series: examples of the coin in both mint state and in circulated condition are valuable.

The high value of the coin has made it a target for counterfeiters. Many fake 1893-S Morgan dollars have been created. Knowledgeable coin collectors can identify a fake based on the variations in the dies which were used to strike the coins.

== Background ==
The 1893-S Morgan dollars were struck at the United States San Francisco Mint. Only 100,000 coins were struck, making it the lowest mintage of any business strike Morgan Dollar. It is thought that few survived in mint state because the majority of the coins were circulated. The coins are struck using blanks which are ninety percent silver. The 1893-S is known as the key date in the Morgan series. In the book 100 Greatest U.S. Coins the authors have said the coin is the most valuable of any business strike Morgan dollar.

== History ==
One reason few examples of the coin have survived is the Panic of 1893. Amid the failure of United States banks the mints produced fewer coins. Later the 1918 Pittman Act called for many silver dollars to be melted. It is thought that many of the 1893-S Morgan dollars were melted as a result of the Pittman Act. Examples of the coin were also circulated heavily in the Western United States as it was developing. The coin is both rare and valuable and it is collected even in circulated grades. Numismatic News has estimated that there are less than 100 1893-S Morgan dollars in uncirculated condition. The two largest coin grading companies, PCGS and NGC, have graded 47 in higher grades.

In 2014 the Eliasberg 1893-S Morgan dollar sold for US$646,250 at auction. It is a Professional Coin Grading Service (PCGS) graded coin in MS-65. In 2021, a PCGS graded 1893-S Morgan dollar in MS-67 sold for US$2,086,875.00. The coin is considered to be the finest known and it is named the Vermeule 1893-S. In March 2023 an 1893-S graded by Numismatic Guaranty Company (NGC), in an MS-64 grade sold for US$372,000.

== Counterfeits ==
Examples of the coin have been counterfeited: NGC has listed it among the top ten most counterfeited coins. One of the most common methods of counterfeiting the coin involves using adding the letter S to the reverse of a 1893 Morgan dollar from the Philadelphia Mint. The Philadelphia minted Morgan is used because that mint does not have a mint mark. The numismatic magazine Coin World has stated that the United States marketplace has seen the introduction of thousands of fake 1893-S Morgan dollars. The magazine has said the counterfeiters have used dies which were made using real Morgan dollars. They have also used the correct composition of metals in the coins so that they are more difficult to detect. Knowledgeable collectors can detect a fake because all 1893-S Morgans were struck using the same obverse die, and only two different reverse dies. The dies have specific variations which counterfeiters have not incorporated into their fakes.

== See also ==
- List of most expensive coins
