= Schoolgirl dollar =

19th century American pattern coin

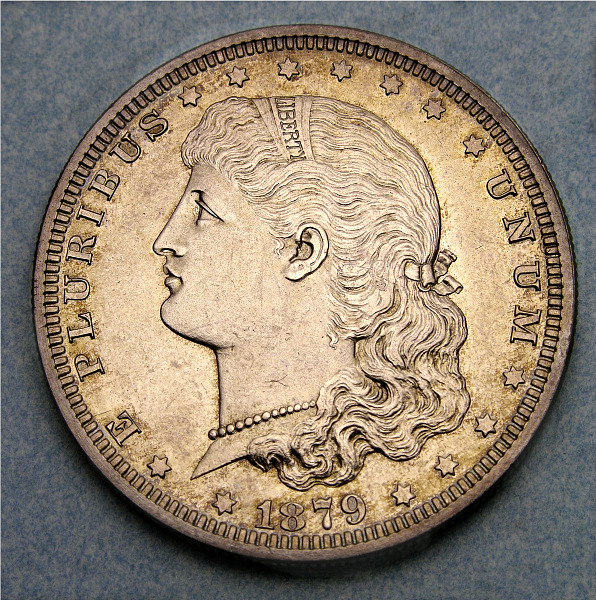
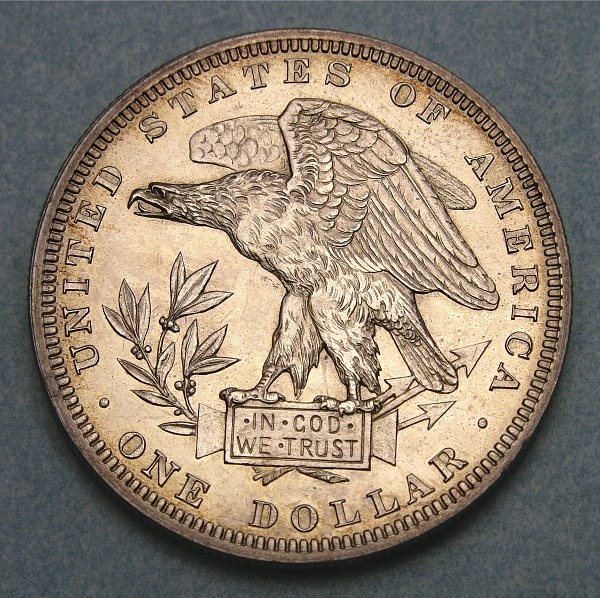
The Schoolgirl dollar

The Schoolgirl dollar was a pattern coin struck by the United States Bureau of the Mint in 1879. Designed by George T. Morgan, it followed the Morgan dollar, which had released the previous year and received criticism for its design. At least 29 coins are known. Numismatists consider the coin one of the finest American patterns.

The earliest use of the name "Schoolgirl dollar" comes from an April 1891 catalogue of the New York Coin & Stamp’s F. W. Doughty sale. Numismatic scholars Edgar Adams and William H. Woodin included the name in their 1913 reference guide on pattern coins.

The obverse depicts Liberty as a young girl wearing pearls and hair falling down her neck. Stars surround the bust, with E PLURIBUS on the right and UNUM on the left, and the date 1879 below. The reverse features a defiant eagle facing left, which Morgan used on an 1877 half dollar pattern. The eagle stands on a pedestal reading IN GOD WE TRUST with an olive branch on the left and arrows on the right. On the border it reads UNITED STATES OF AMERICA and ONE DOLLAR. The eagle design would reappear on the quarter eagle issued as part of the Panama-Pacific commemorative coins. The reason why Morgan created the pattern is unknown; numismatists believe Morgan created the design either in response to the criticism the Morgan dollar received or to demonstrate his talents in hopes of becoming Chief Engraver.

The coin was struck in three different metals: silver, copper and lead. Fifteen silver and thirteen copper examples are known. The lead specimen is unique.
