= Kennedy half dollar mintage figures =

United States coin

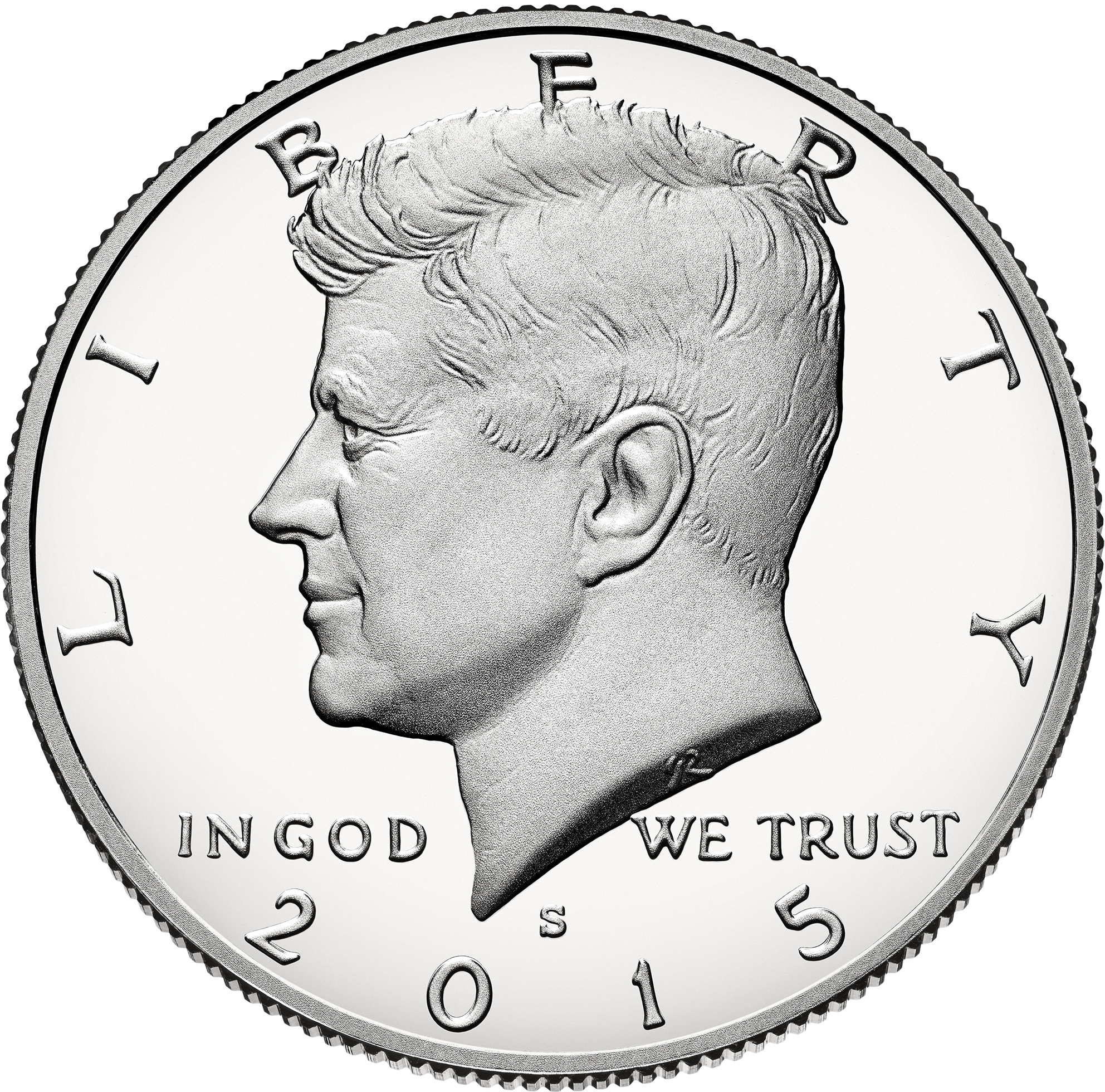
The obverse of a Kennedy half dollar

The Kennedy half dollar is a United States coin that has been minted since 1964. In the first year of production the coins were minted in 90% silver and 10% copper (90% silver). From 1965 through 1970, the coins were minted in a clad composition of mostly silver outer layers and a mostly copper inner layer (40% silver). After 1970, the coins are minted in a copper–nickel clad composition. From 1992 to 2018, 90% silver coins were made for inclusion in special "Limited Edition" silver proof sets. Beginning 2019 coins in the special silver proof sets are produced from pure (.999) silver.

All coins minted in 1975 and 1976 for the United States Bicentennial bore the dates "1776-1976". All 1970 and 1987 coins were issued only in special collector's sets (none released for general circulation). Due to declining demand for half dollars, 2001 was the last year the mint issued half dollars for general circulation (business strikes). Beginning in 2002, the coins were minted in smaller numbers and sold only to collectors at premiums above the face value. In 2021, half dollars were once again shipped to the Federal Reserve and thus released for general circulation.

For the 50th anniversary of the Kennedy Half Dollar, the mint issued a 3/4-ounce .9999 gold version bearing the special date of "1964-2014".

== Mintage figures ==
Date	Mint mark	Business strike mintage	Proof mintage
1964 (90% silver)		277,254,766	3,950,762
1964 (90% silver)	D	156,205,446	
1965 (40% silver)		65,879,366	
1966 (40% silver)		108,984,932	
1967 (40% silver)		295,046,978	
1968 (40% silver)	D	246,951,930	
1968 (40% silver)	S		3,041,506
1969 (40% silver)	D	129,881,800	
1969 (40% silver)	S		2,934,731
1970 (40% silver)	D	2,150,000	
1970 (40% silver)	S		2,632,810
1971		155,164,000	
1971	D	302,097,424	
1971	S		3,220,733
1972		153,180,000	
1972	D	141,890,000	
1972	S		3,260,996
1973		64,964,000	
1973	D	83,171,400	
1973	S		2,760,339
1974		201,596,000	
1974	D	64,625,000	
1974	S		2,612,568
1976		234,308,000	
1976	D	287,565,248	
1976	S		7,059,099
1976 (40% silver)	S	11,000,000	4,000,000
1977		43,598,000	
1977	D	31,449,106	
1977	S		3,251,152
1978		14,350,000	
1978	D	13,765,799	
1978	S		3,127,781
1979		68,312,000	
1979	D	15,815,422	
1979	S		3,677,175
1980	P	44,134,000	
1980	D	33,456,449	
1980	S		3,554,806
1981	P	29,544,000	
1981	D	27,839,533	
1981	S		4,063,083
1982	P	10,819,000	
1982	D	13,140,102	
1982	S		3,857,479
1983	P	34,139,000	
1983	D	32,472,244	
1983	S		3,279,126
1984	P	26,029,000	
1984	D	26,262,158	
1984	S		3,065,110
1985	P	18,706,962	
1985	D	19,814,034	
1985	S		3,362,821
1986	P	13,107,633	
1986	D	15,336,145	
1986	S		3,010,497
1987	P	2,890,758	
1987	D	2,890,758	
1987	S		4,227,728
1988	P	13,626,000	
1988	D	12,000,096	
1988	S		3,262,948
1989	P	24,542,000	
1989	D	23,000,216	
1989	S		3,220,194
1990	P	22,278,000	
1990	D	20,096,242	
1990	S		3,299,559
1991	P	14,874,000	
1991	D	15,054,678	
1991	S		2,867,787
1992	P	17,628,000	
1992	D	17,000,106	
1992	S		2,858,981
1992 (90% silver)	S		1,317,579
1993	P	15,510,000	
1993	D	15,000,006	
1993	S		2,633,439
1993 (90% silver)	S		761,353
1994	P	23,718,000	
1994	D	23,828,110	
1994	S		2,484,594
1994 (90% silver)	S		785,329
1995	P	26,496,000	
1995	D	26,288,000	
1995	S		2,117,496
1995 (90% silver)	S		679,985
1996	P	24,442,000	
1996	D	24,744,000	
1996	S		1,750,244
1996 (90% silver)	S		775,021
1997	P	20,882,000	
1997	D	19,876,000	
1997	S		2,055,000
1997 (90% silver)	S		741,678
1998	P	15,646,000	
1998	D	15,064,000	
1998	S		2,086,507
1998 (90% silver)	S		878,792
1998 (90% silver)	S		64,141 Matte finish
1999	P	8,900,000	
1999	D	10,682,000	
1999	S		2,543,401
1999 (90% silver)	S		804,565
2000	P	22,600,000	
2000	D	19,466,000	
2000	S		3,082,483
2000 (90% silver)	S		965,421
2001	P	21,200,000	
2001	D	19,504,000	
2001	S		2,294,909
2001 (90% silver)	S		889,697
2002	P	3,100,000	
2002	D	2,500,000	
2002	S		2,319,766
2002 (90% silver)	S		892,229
2003	P	2,500,000	
2003	D	2,500,000	
2003	S		2,172,684
2003 (90% silver)	S		1,125,755
2004	P	2,900,000	
2004	D	2,900,000	
2004	S		1,789,488
2004 (90% silver)	S		1,175,934
2005	P	3,800,000	
2005	D	3,500,000	
2005	S		2,275,000
2005 (90% silver)	S		1,069,679
2006	P	2,400,000	
2006	D	2,000,000	
2006	S		2,000,428
2006 (90% silver)	S		1,054,008
2007	P	2,400,000	
2007	D	2,400,000	
2007	S		1,384,797
2007 (90% silver)	S		875,050
2008	P	1,700,000	
2008	D	1,700,000	
2008	S		1,377,424
2008 (90% silver)	S		620,684
2009	P	1,900,000	
2009	D	1,900,000	
2009	S		1,477,967
2009 (90% silver)	S		694,406
2010	P	1,800,000	
2010	D	1,700,000	
2010	S		1,103,950
2010 (90% silver)	S		585,414
2011	P	1,750,000	
2011	D	1,700,000	
2011	S		1,098,835
2011 (90% silver)	S		574,175
2012	P	1,800,000	
2012	D	1,700,000	
2012	S		794,002
2012 (90% silver)	S		395,443
2013	P	5,000,000	
2013	D	4,600,000	
2013	S		802,460
2013 (90% silver)	S		419,720
2014	P	2,500,000	
2014	D	2,100,000	
2014	S		704,806
2014 (90% silver)	S	218,783 Enhanced	424,781
2014 (90% silver)	W		218,783 Reverse Proof
2014 (90% silver)	P		218,783
2014 (90% silver)	D	218,783	
2014 (99.99% gold)	W		69,319
2015	P	2,300,000	
2015	D	2,300,000	
2015	S		662,855
2015 (90% silver)	S		387,311
2016	P	2,100,000	
2016	D	2,100,000	
2016	S		570,209
2016 (90% silver)	S		353,205
2017	P	1,800,000	
2017	D	2,900,000	
2017	S	225,000 Enhanced	568,678
2017 (90% silver)	S		358,085
2018	P	4,800,000	
2018	D	6,100,000	
2018	S		492,901
2018 (90% silver)	S		354,302
2018 (90% silver)	S		199,116 Reverse Proof
2019	P	1,700,000	
2019	D	1,700,000	
2019	S		600,594
2019 (99.9% silver)	S		412,509
2019	S		99,932 Reverse Proof
2020	P	2,300,000	
2020	D	3,400,000	
2020	S		464,188
2020 (99.9% silver)	S		313,184
2021	P	5,400,000	
2021	D	7,700,000	
2021	S		559,571
2021 (99.9% silver)	S		350,891
2022	P	4,800,000	
2022	D	4,900,000	
2022	S		446,082
2022 (99.9% silver)	S		297,063
2023	P	30,200,000	
2023	D	27,800,000	
2023	S		362,711
2023 (99.9% silver)	S		212,565
2024	P	15,700,000	
2024	D	21,900,000	
2024	S		355,786
2024 (99.9% silver)	S		170,440
2025	P	11,200,000	
2025	D	12,000,000	
2025	S		304,725
2025 (99.9% silver)	S		113,777

== See also ==
- United States cent mintage figures
  - Lincoln cent mintage figures
- United States nickel mintage figures
- Roosevelt dime mintage figures
- United States quarter mintage figures
  - Washington quarter mintage figures
  - 50 State quarter mintage figures
  - America the Beautiful quarter mintage figures
  - American Women quarters
- United States half dollar mintage figures
- American Silver Eagle mintage figures
