= Morgan dollar =

U.S. dollar coin (1878–1904, 1921, 2021–present)

- Value: 1 United States dollar
- Mass: 26.73 g (412 1/2 gr)
- Diameter: 38.1 mm (1.5 in)
- Thickness: 2.4 mm (0.09 in)
- Edge: Reeded
- Composition: 90.0% Silver; 10.0% Copper (1878–1904, 1921); 99.9% Silver (2021–present)
- Years of minting: 1878–1904, 1921, 2021–present
- Mint marks: None (Philadelphia); CC (Carson City); S (San Francisco); O (New Orleans); D (Denver)

Obverse
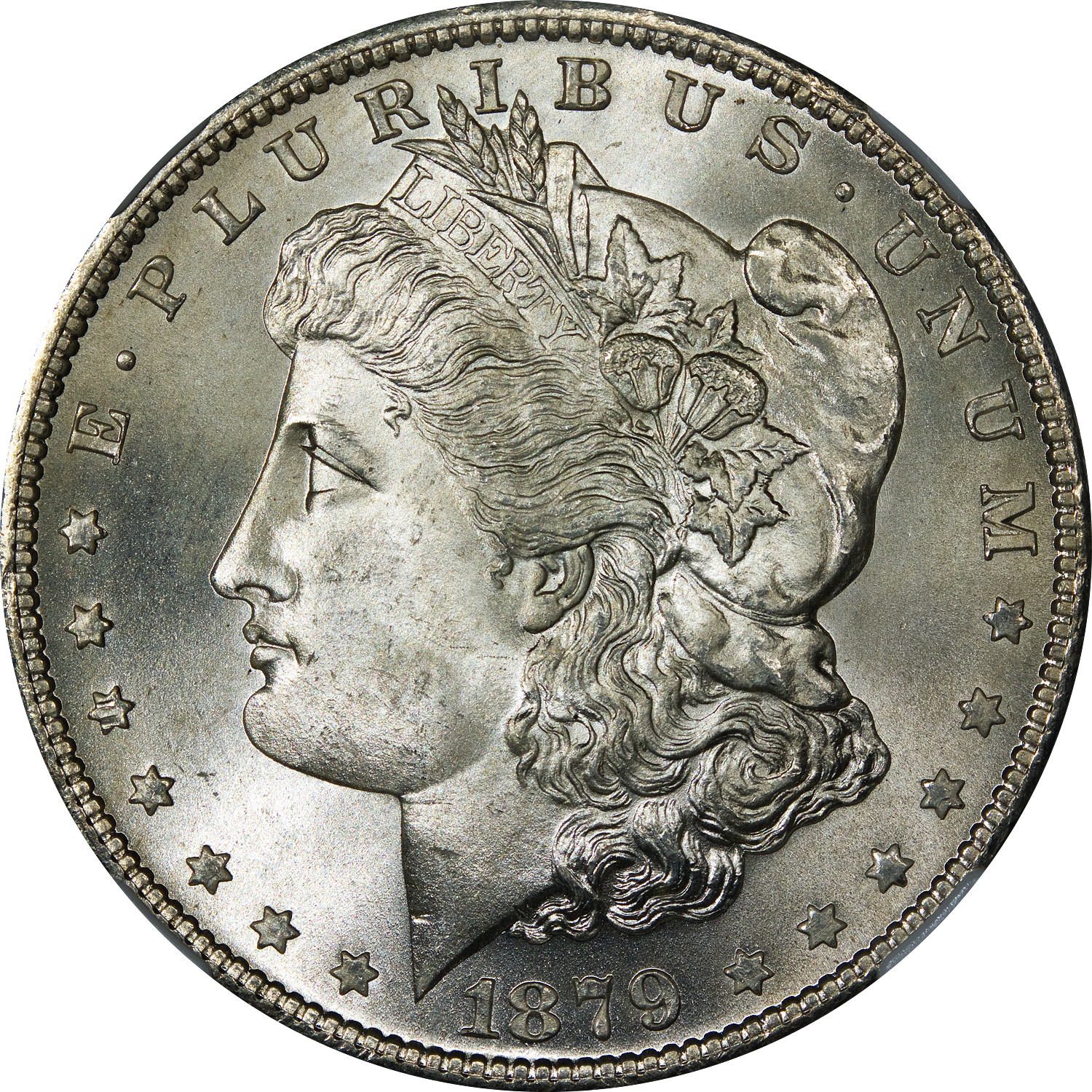
- Design: Liberty
- Designer: George T. Morgan
- Design date: 1878

Reverse
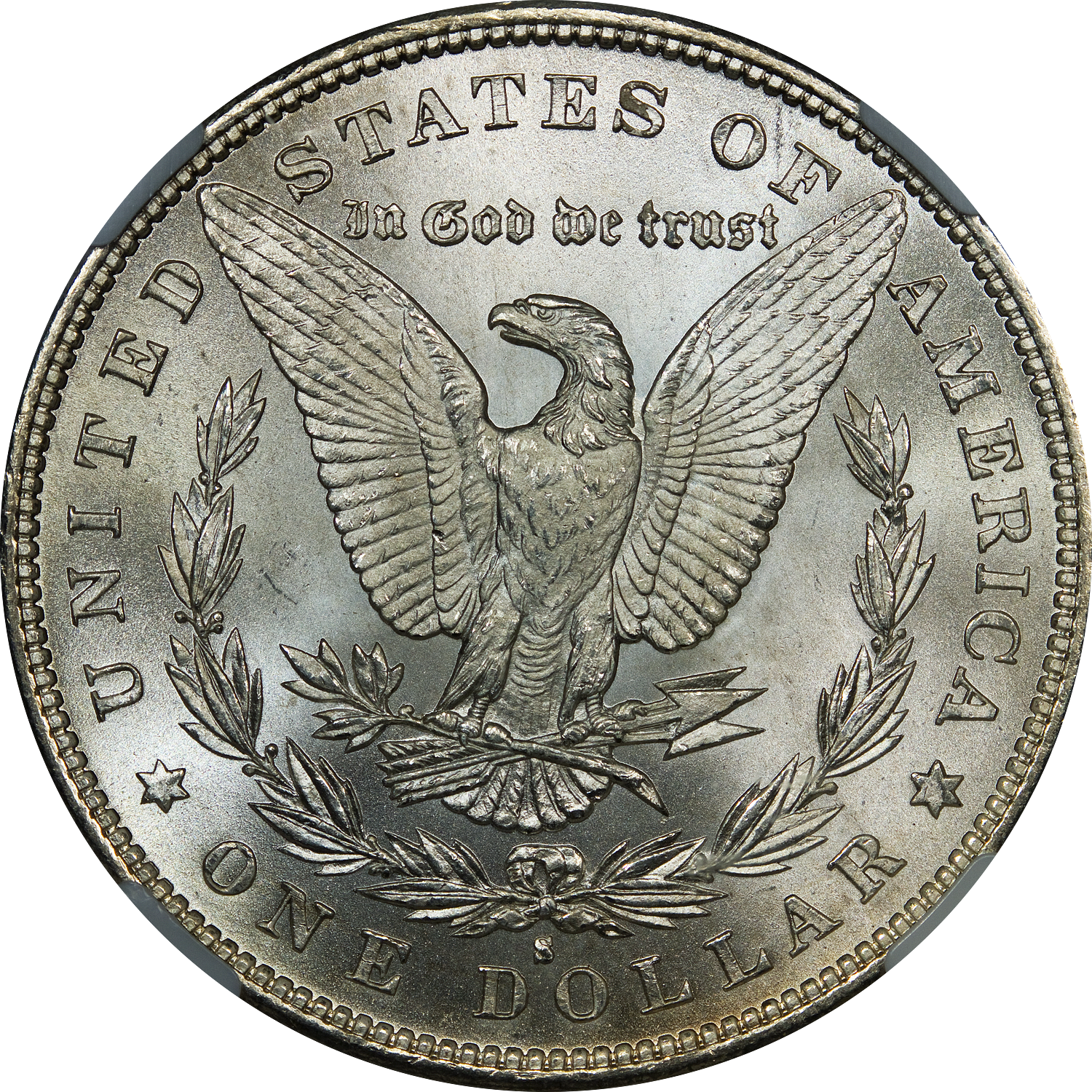
- Design: Eagle clasping arrows and olive branch
- Designer: George T. Morgan
- Design date: 1878

The Morgan dollar is a United States dollar coin minted from 1878 to 1904, as well as 1921. It was minted again beginning in 2021 as a collectible. It was the first standard silver dollar minted since the passage of the Coinage Act of 1873, which ended the free coining of silver and the production of the previous design, the Seated Liberty dollar. It contained 412.5 Troy grains of 90% pure silver (or 371.25 Troy grains = 24.057 g; 0.7734 ozt of pure silver). The coin is named after its designer, United States Mint Assistant Engraver George T. Morgan. The obverse depicts a profile portrait representing Liberty, modeled by Anna Willess Williams, while the reverse depicts an eagle with wings outstretched. The mint mark, if present, appears on the reverse above between D and O in "Dollar".

The dollar was authorized by the Bland–Allison Act. Following the passage of the 1873 act, mining interests lobbied to restore free silver, which would require the Mint to accept all silver presented to it and return it, struck into coin. Instead, the Bland–Allison Act was passed, which required the Treasury to purchase between two and four million dollars' worth of silver at market value to be coined into dollars each month. In 1890, the Bland–Allison Act was repealed by the Sherman Silver Purchase Act, which required the Treasury to purchase 4,500,000 troy ounces (140,000 kg) of silver each month, but only required further silver dollar production for one year. This act, once again, was repealed in 1893.

In 1898, Congress approved a bill that required all remaining bullion purchased under the Sherman Silver Purchase Act to be coined into silver dollars. When those silver reserves were depleted in 1904, the Mint ceased to strike the Morgan dollar. The Pittman Act, passed in 1918, authorized the melting and recoining of millions of silver dollars. Pursuant to the act, Morgan dollars resumed mintage for one year in 1921. The design was replaced by the Peace dollar later the same year.

In the early 1960s, a large quantity of uncirculated Morgan dollars in their original bags were discovered in the Treasury vaults, including issues once thought rare. Individuals began purchasing large quantities of the pieces at face value and then removed them from circulation through hoarding, and eventually the Treasury ceased exchanging silver certificates for silver coin. Beginning in the 1970s, the Treasury conducted a sale of silver dollars minted at the Carson City Mint through the General Services Administration. In 2006, Morgan's reverse design was used on a silver dollar issued to commemorate the old San Francisco Mint building. The US Mint began striking Morgan Dollars again in 2021, initially as a commemorative to celebrate the 100th anniversary of the conclusion of the design's final usage, then as an annual release starting in 2023.

== Background ==
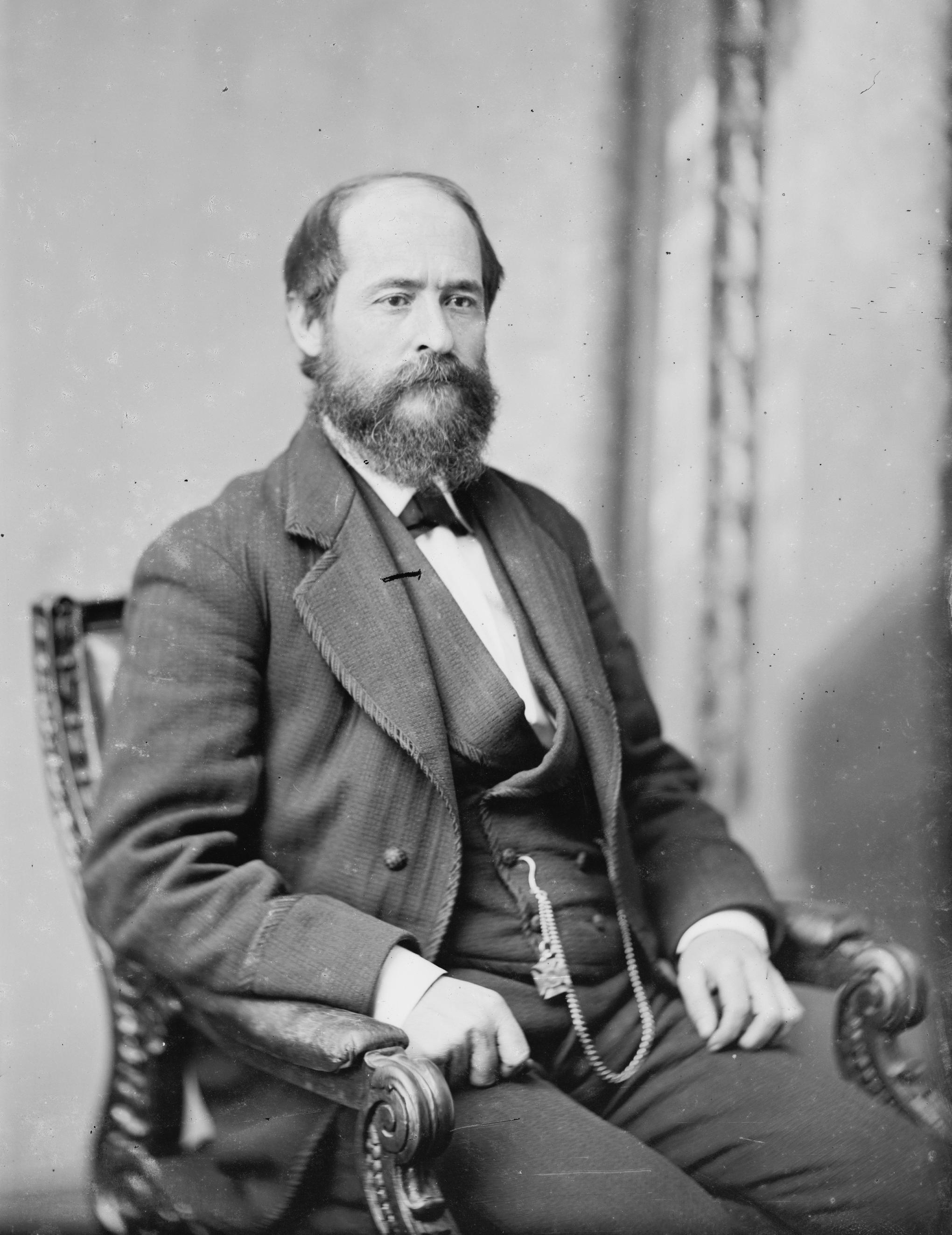
In 1876, Richard P. Bland introduced a bill in the House to resume coinage of the standard silver dollar.

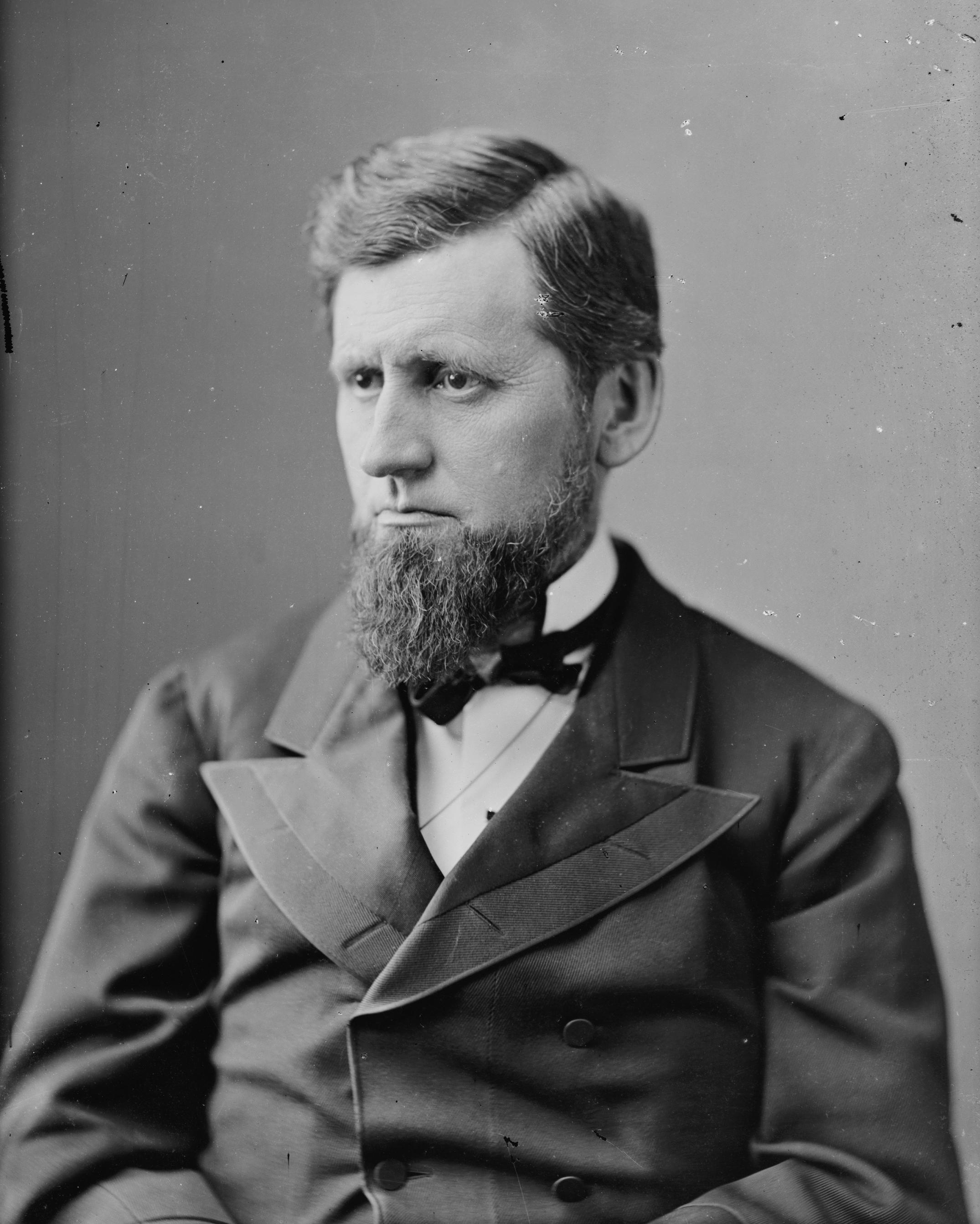
William B. Allison added amendments to the bill in the Senate

In 1873, Congress enacted the Fourth Coinage Act, which effectively ended the bimetallic standard in the United States by demonetizing silver bullion. Prior to enactment of the Coinage Act, silver could be brought to the mints and coined into legal tender for a small fee. With such a system in place, bullion producers could have silver coined into dollars when the intrinsic value of a silver dollar was lower than the face value, thus making a profit, flooding the money supply and causing inflation. The act ended production of the standard silver dollar (then the Seated Liberty dollar, as designed by Christian Gobrecht) and provided for mintage of a silver trade dollar, which was intended to compete with Mexican dollars for use in the Orient. Under the act, bullion producers were allowed to bring bullion to the mints in order to be cast into bars or coined into the newly authorized trade dollars for a small fee. Trade dollars initially held legal tender status, but it was revoked in 1876 to prevent bullion producers from making a profit by coining silver into trade dollars when the value of the metal was low. The restrictions on free coinage laid out in the Coinage Act initially met little resistance from mining interests until the price of silver declined rapidly due to increased mining in the Western United States. Protests also came from bankers, manufacturers and farmers, who felt an increased money supply would have a positive impact. Groups were formed that demanded the free coinage of silver (or "free silver") in order to inflate the dollar following the Panic of 1873.

Beginning in 1876, several bills were introduced in the House of Representatives in an effort to resume the free coinage of silver. One such bill introduced into the House by Democratic Representative Richard P. Bland of Missouri was passed in the fall of 1876. Republican senator William B. Allison of Iowa added important amendments to the bill in the Senate. The House bill allowed Free Silver; one of Allison's amendments struck that provision. This same amendment allowed for the issuance of silver certificates for the first time in United States history. The bill was vetoed by President Rutherford B. Hayes. The president's veto was overridden on February 28, 1878. What came to be known as the Bland–Allison Act required that the Treasury purchase between two and four million dollars' worth of silver per month, to be coined into silver dollars at the former silver/gold value ratio of 16:1, meaning that one ounce of gold would be valued the same as sixteen ounces of silver.

== Design history ==
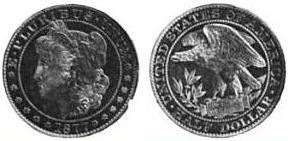
A pattern half dollar created by George T. Morgan

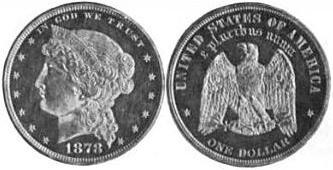
A pattern for the standard silver dollar created by William Barber

In 1876, Director of the Mint Henry Linderman began efforts to redesign the nation's silver coins. Linderman contacted C.W. Fremantle, Deputy Master of the Royal Mint in London, requesting him to "find a first-class die-sinker who would be willing to take the position of Assistant Engraver at the Mint at Philadelphia." In response to Linderman's request, Fremantle wrote: "My inquiries as to an Assistant Engraver lead me very strongly to recommend for the post Mr. George Morgan, age 30, who has made himself a considerable name, but for whom there is not much opening at present in this country." An agreement was reached between Linderman and Morgan for the engraver to work at the Philadelphia Mint under Chief Engraver William Barber on a six-month trial basis.

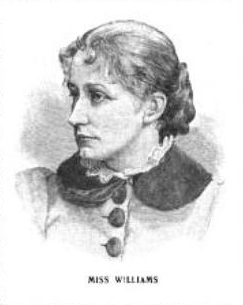
Anna Willess Williams, Morgan's model for Liberty, as depicted in an 1892 issue of Ladies' Home Journal

Morgan arrived in Philadelphia on October 9, 1876. His earliest pattern coins, designed during his tenure at the Philadelphia Mint, were intended for the half dollar. In 1876, Morgan enrolled at the Pennsylvania Academy of the Fine Arts to prepare to create a new Liberty head design. Morgan also obtained studies from the nature of the bald eagle for the preparation of the reverse design. For the representation of Liberty, Morgan sought to depict an American woman rather than the usual Greek-style figures. Morgan's friend, artist Thomas Eakins, suggested he use Anna Willess Williams of Philadelphia as a model. In total, Morgan had five sittings with Williams; he declared her profile to be the most perfect he had seen.

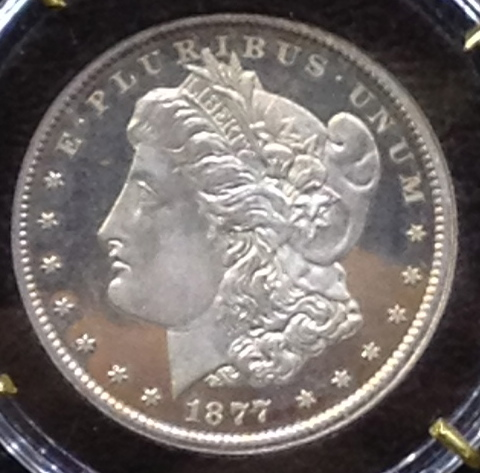
Morgan's design, struck as a half dollar pattern in 1877

On October 18, 1877, Linderman requested Superintendent of the Philadelphia Mint James Pollock to "instruct Mr. Morgan to prepare without delay, dies for a silver dollar, the designs, inscriptions, and arrangement thereof to be the same as the enclosed impression for the Half Dollar and numbered '2' substituting the words 'one dollar' in place of 'half dollar'". Linderman also ordered Pollock to "instruct Mr. Barber to prepare a reverse die for a dollar with a representation of an eagle as well as the inscriptions required by law. He will select whichever of his Heads of Liberty he prefers for the obverse of the same." Linderman evidently preferred the designs of Morgan over those of the Chief Engraver; he wrote Pollock on February 21, 1878, "I have now to state for your information, that it is my intention, in the event of the silver bill now pending in Congress, becoming law, to request the approval by the Secretary of the Treasury, of the dies prepared by Mr. Morgan."

== Production ==
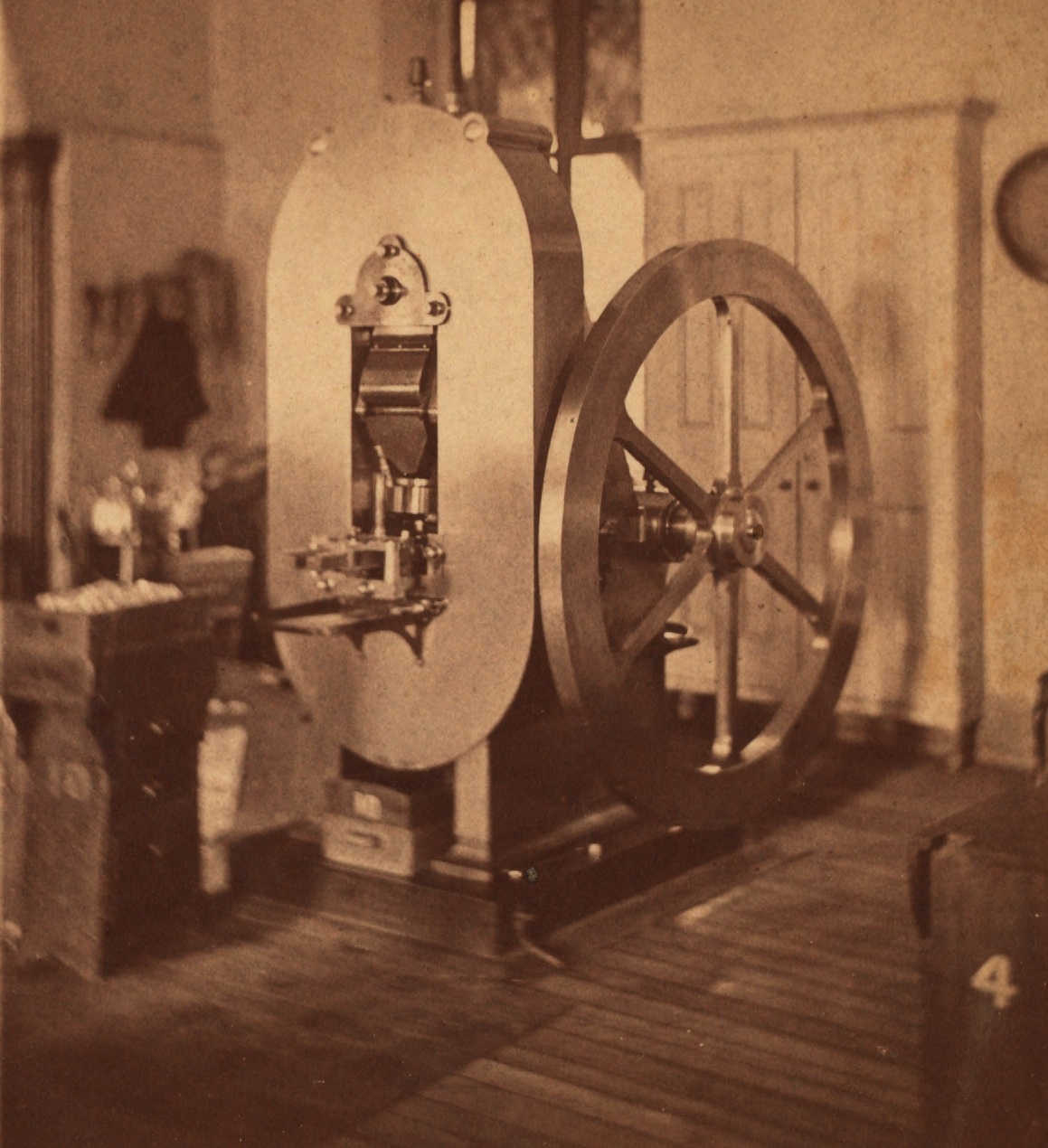
A coinage press at the Philadelphia Mint

Production of the coins did not commence until March 11, more than a week after the passage of the Bland–Allison Act. The first acceptable strike, after adjustments to the press, was coined at 3:17 p.m. at the Philadelphia Mint. This piece was given to President Hayes; the second and third were given to Secretary of the Treasury John Sherman and Mint Director Henry Linderman.

Linderman desired to involve the western mints of San Francisco and Carson City in production in order to help reach the monthly quota necessary under the Bland–Allison Act. Pressure was so great at the Philadelphia Mint that it halted production of all other coins and began operating overtime. Use of the western mints was delayed, however, as all dies were prepared at the Philadelphia Mint, and it was believed that the Western mints did not have the proper equipment to prepare the dies for use. During the second week of production, Linderman pointed out what he called a "slight imperfection" in the dies for the dollar. The reason for the changes was to reduce the relief of the designs and to change the number of tail feathers on the eagle from eight to seven; this was done because all prior United States coinage depicted the bald eagle as having an odd number of tail feathers. The high relief had caused the dies to have a shorter life. Dies were eventually sent to the Western mints, arriving in both San Francisco and Carson City on April 16, 1878. The New Orleans Mint began striking the new silver dollars in 1879.

The Denver Mint, established in 1906, struck the coins for only one year, in 1921. The mint marks appearing on the coins are none, representing Philadelphia, "CC" for Carson City, "S" for San Francisco, "O" for New Orleans and "D" for Denver. In order to conform to the Coinage Act of 1837, the Morgan dollar contained ninety percent silver and ten percent copper, measured 38.1 millimetres (1.50 in) in diameter and weighed 412.5 grains (26.73 g). Thus the pure silver content was 371.25 Troy grains = 24.057 g; 0.7734 ozt.

=== Key date ===
The key date in the Morgan dollar series is the 1893-S Morgan dollar, which was struck at the United States San Francisco Mint. With a mintage of 100,000 coins struck, it is the lowest mintage of any Morgan Dollar. It is thought that few survived in mint state (MS) because the majority of the coins were in circulation. In 2021 an 1893-S Morgan dollar in MS-67 sold for US$2,086,875. (Note: equivalent to $2.48 million in 2025 adjusted for inflation)

== Sherman Silver Purchase Act, Panic of 1893 ==
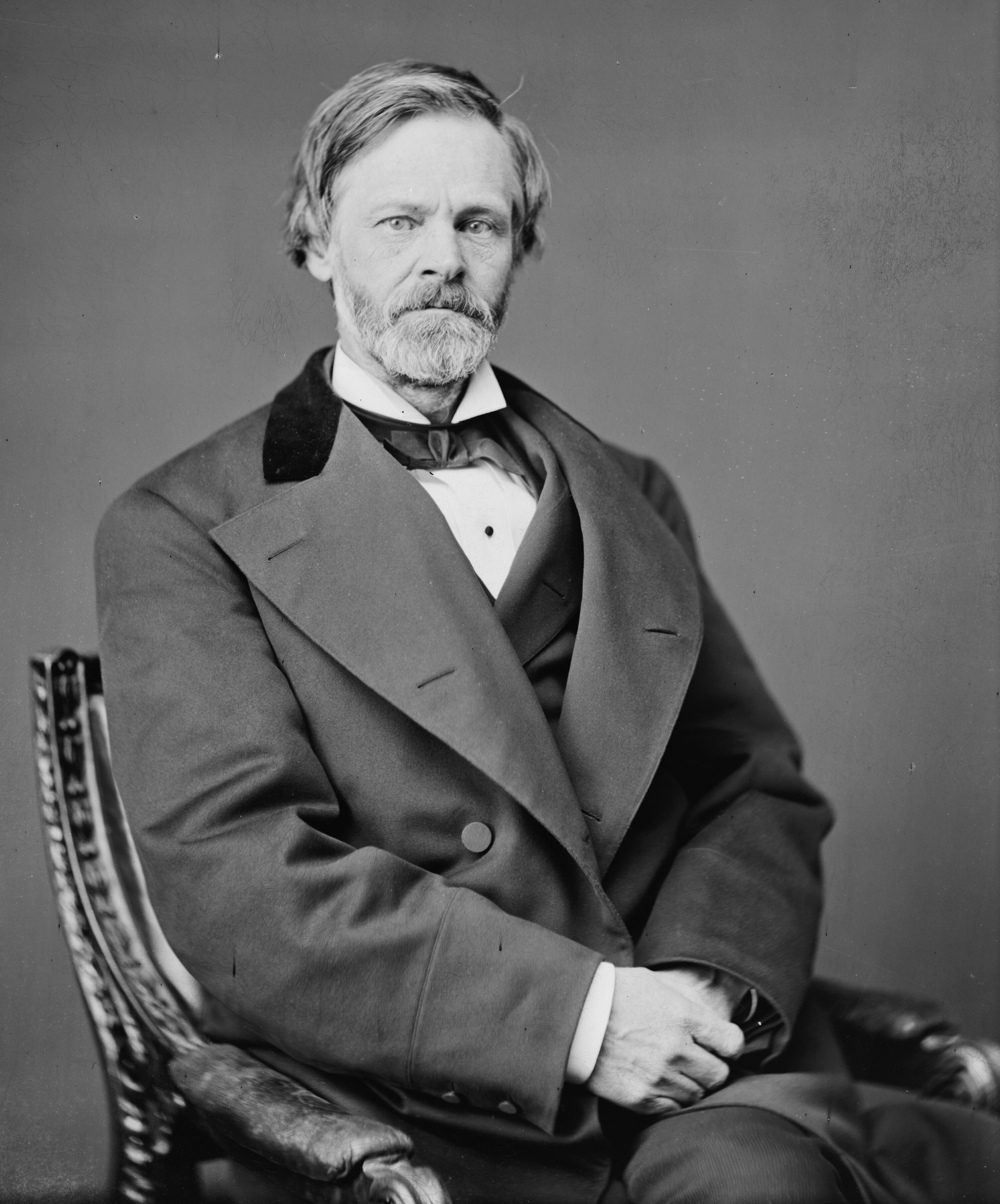
Ohio senator John Sherman authored the Sherman Silver Purchase Act, forcing the Treasury to purchase 4,500,000 troy ounces (140,000 kg) each month.

Mintage of the Morgan dollar remained relatively steady until the passage of the Sherman Silver Purchase Act on July 14, 1890. The act, authored by Ohio senator and former Treasury secretary John Sherman, forced the Treasury to increase the amount of silver purchased to 4,500,000 troy ounces (140,000 kg) each month. Supporters of the act believed that an increase in the amount of silver purchased would result in inflation, helping to relieve the nation's farmers. The act also received support from mining interests because such large purchases would cause the price of silver to rise and increase their profits. Despite the Act's requiring large purchases of silver indefinitely, it provided that the Mint must coin 2,000,000 silver dollars each month only until 1891. Minting of dollars dropped sharply beginning in 1892. The silver that remained after mintage of the dollars was used to mint dimes, quarters and half dollars.

Beginning early in 1893, a number of industrial firms, including the Philadelphia and Reading Railroad and the National Cordage Company went bankrupt. The resulting bank runs and failures became known as the Panic of 1893. In June of that year, President Grover Cleveland, who believed that the Panic was caused by the inflation generated by the Sherman Silver Purchase Act, called a special session of Congress in order to repeal it. The act was repealed on November 1, 1893. On June 13, 1898, Congress ordered the coining of all the remaining bullion purchased under the Sherman Silver Purchase Act into silver dollars. Silver dollar production rose again, until the bullion was exhausted in 1904, when it ceased.

== Pittman Act ==
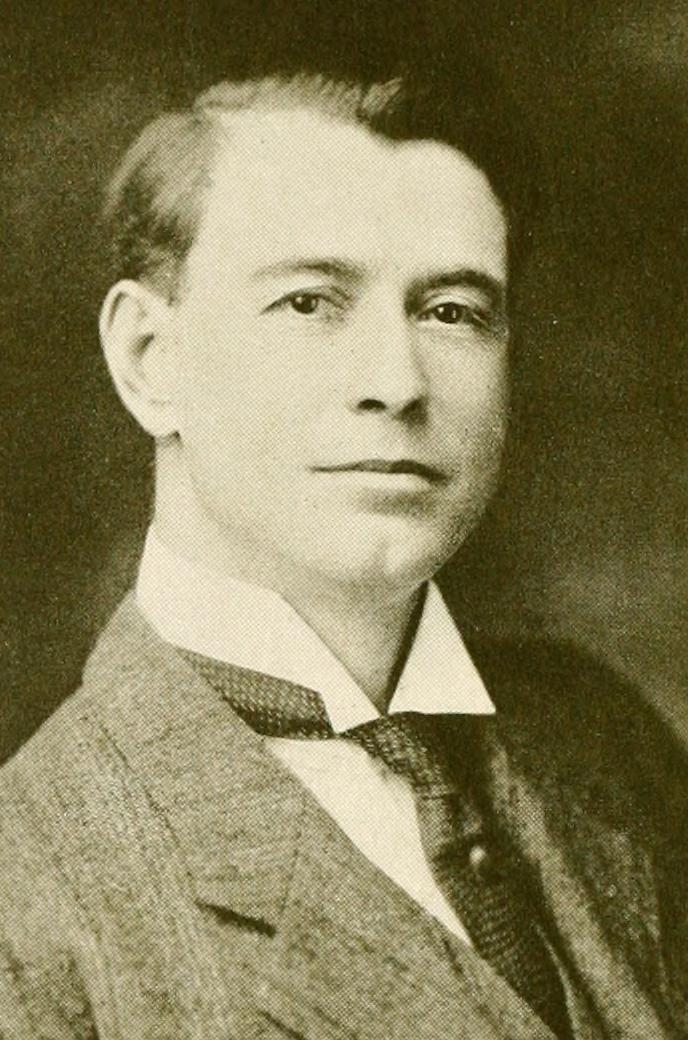
Senator Key Pittman was responsible for the act that called for the melting of up to 350,000,000 silver dollars.

The German government began a propaganda campaign during World War I to discredit the United Kingdom's currency in India. The Germans convinced Indian citizens that British banknotes in that country could not be redeemed for silver. This led to a run on the British supply of silver. In response, United States Democratic senator Key Pittman of Nevada introduced legislation in 1918 that was intended to offer financial relief to the British government. The bill, passed on April 22, 1918, stated that "sales of silver bullion under authority of this act may be made for the purpose of conserving the existing stock of gold in the United States, of providing silver for subsidiary coinage and for commercial use, and of assisting foreign governments at war with the enemies of the United States". The Pittman Act authorized the U.S. to melt up to 350,000,000 silver dollars, and this commenced immediately after the Act's passage. The U.S. eventually melted a total of 270,232,722 silver dollars. Of that amount, 259,121,554 were sold to the United Kingdom at the cost of one dollar per troy ounce.

The U.S. only minted the Morgan dollar again during 1921, the only year in which Morgan dollars were struck at the Denver mint. Since the Treasury had destroyed the obsolete Morgan dollar dies in 1910, Morgan had to create an entirely new master die. Another provision of the Pittman Act authorized the U.S. to mint a replacement coin for every silver dollar melted. During the same year, the Peace dollar was first issued to commemorate the end of World War I. The Peace dollar was approved to replace the outdated Morgan dollar design under the terms of the Pittman Act but without congressional authorization, despite the fact that the Act did not describe the coin design. The change in design was actually authorized under an 1890 act of Congress, which stated:

But no change in the design or die of any coin shall be made oftener than once in twenty-five years from and including the year of the first adoption of the design, model, die, or hub for the same coin:

Provided, That no change be made in the diameter of any coin:

And provided further, That nothing in this section shall prevent the adoption of new designs or models for devices or emblems already authorized for the standard silver dollar and the five-cent nickel piece as soon as practicable after the passage of this act.

== Carson City Mint Morgan dollars ==
Until 1964, U.S. citizens could redeem paper money known as silver certificates for silver dollars at a U.S. Treasury mint on demand. In 1962, an individual redeemed a silver certificate and received a rare and valuable Morgan dollar in exchange. The coin was from a bag of silver dollars in the vault of the Philadelphia Mint. This incident triggered huge interest, and between November 1962 and March 1964, millions of Morgan and Peace dollars were sold to the general public. The demand to exchange silver certificates for silver dollars was so great that lines formed outside of the Treasury Building in Washington, D.C. Some people in line were pushing wheelbarrows. The U.S. Treasury discovered previously unknown mint bags in its vaults containing slightly more than 2.8 million Carson City silver dollars. Treasury officials decided to hold them back because the total number of coins minted at the Carson City mint were generally lower than others.

On May 12, 1969, the Joint Commission on Coinage held a meeting in order to determine the best way to sell the Carson City-minted dollars. They recommended a mail bid sale. Legislation was passed on December 31, 1970, directing the Treasury to transfer the silver dollars to the Administrator of General Services who was given the responsibility for marketing and selling the coins. The legislation also stated that all proceeds from the sale were to be "covered into the Treasury as miscellaneous receipts." Congress supplied the General Services Administration with $10 million to market the dollar coins. Advertising consisted of posters and brochures distributed to post offices, banks and various financial institutions, as well as television documentaries. The coins were sorted and mounted in small plastic display cases. The GSA conducted a total of seven mail bid sales between 1972 and 1980. In total, the sales generated $107 million (Note: equivalent to $418 million in 2025 adjusted for inflation) in revenue.

Being about only 2% of Morgans were minted at Carson City, they demand a premium on the collector's market.

== San Francisco commemorative dollar reverse ==
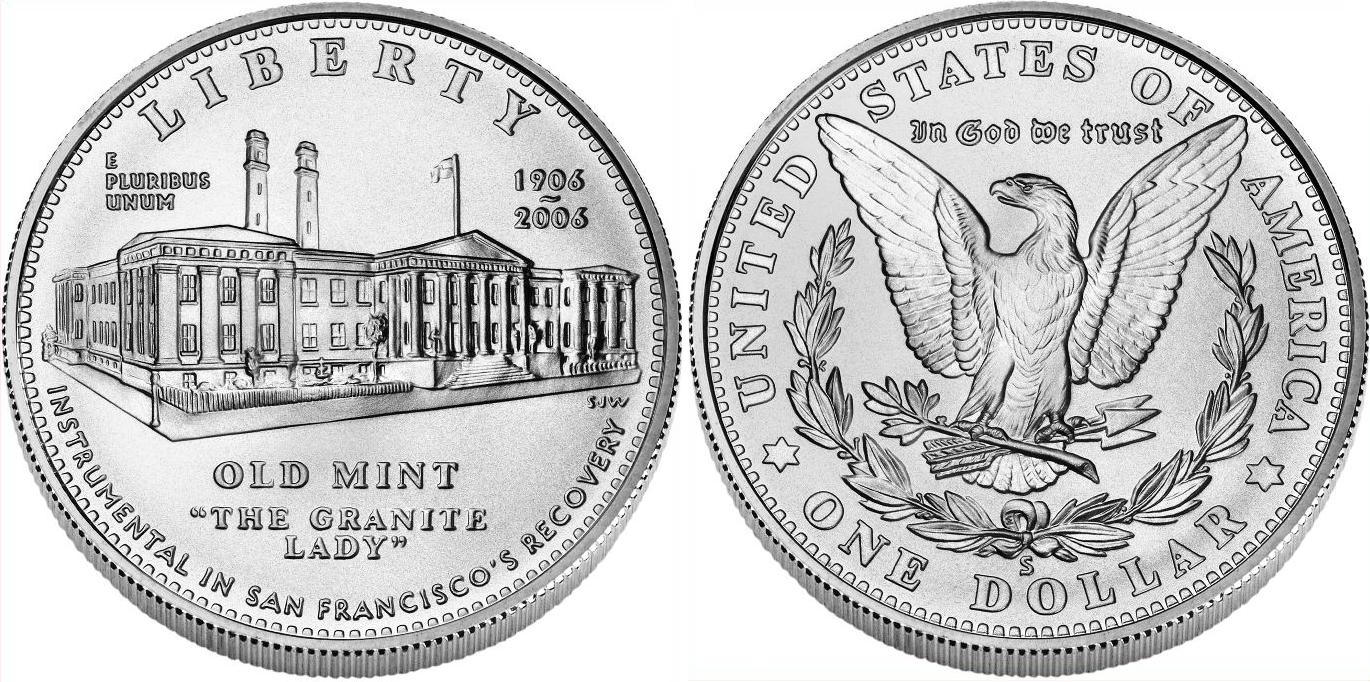
2006 commemorative silver dollar, bearing Morgan's reverse design with modifications

On June 15, 2006, legislation was approved that provided for the minting of a silver dollar and a five dollar gold coin in "commemoration of the Old Mint at San Francisco," with surcharges to be given to the San Francisco Museum and Historical Society in an effort to rehabilitate the Old Mint. In total, 100,000 gold and 500,000 silver San Francisco Old Mint commemorative coins were authorized. Authorization came at the behest of several hobby publications, who enlisted readers to contact their local congressmen and persuade them to pass necessary legislation. The approved designs include a frontal view of the Old Mint building on the obverse and a copy of Morgan's eagle design on the reverse. Mint artist Joseph Menna made a new model for the reverse, employing a 1904 San Francisco-minted dollar as his model.

== Modern Morgan dollars ==
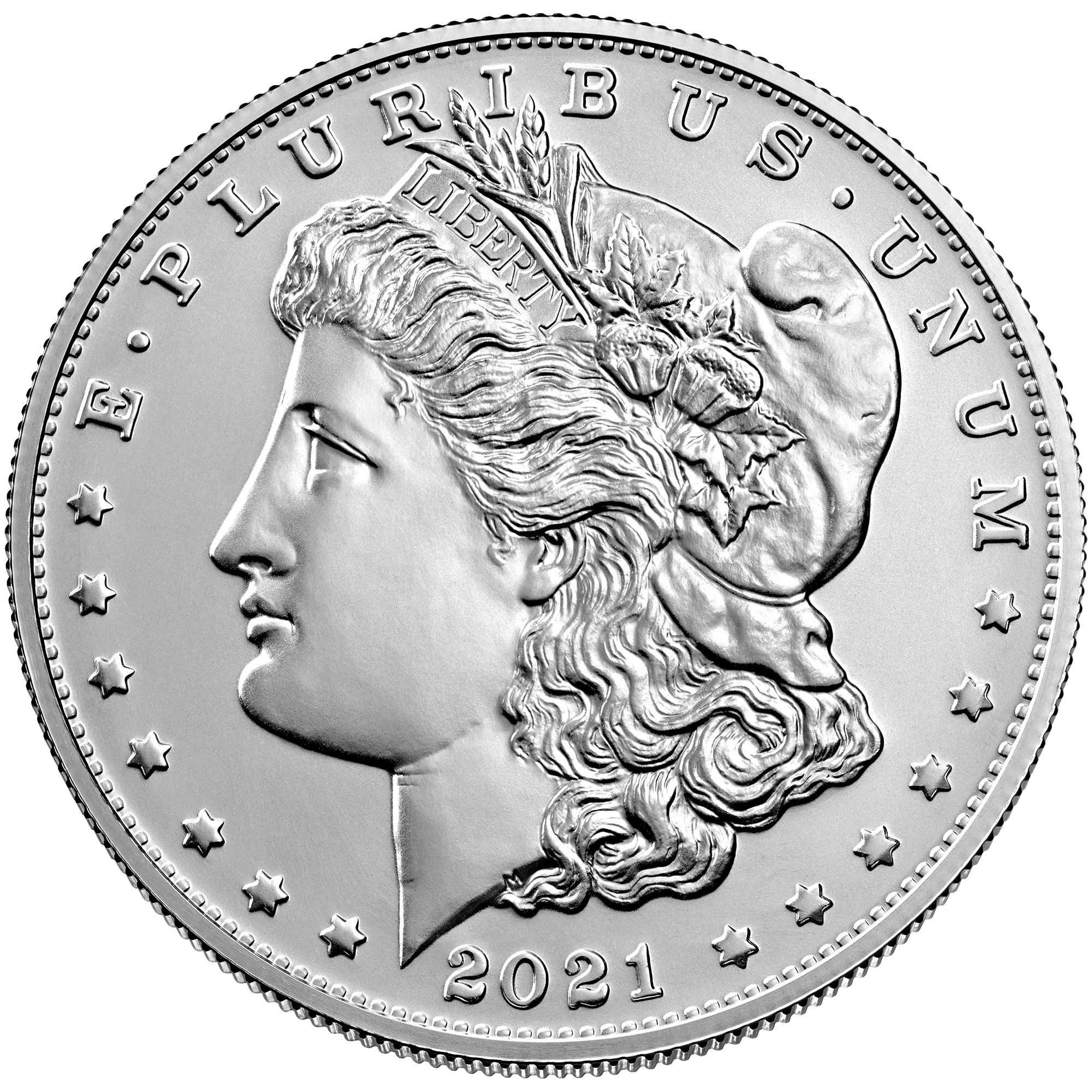
Obverse of the 2021 Morgan dollar

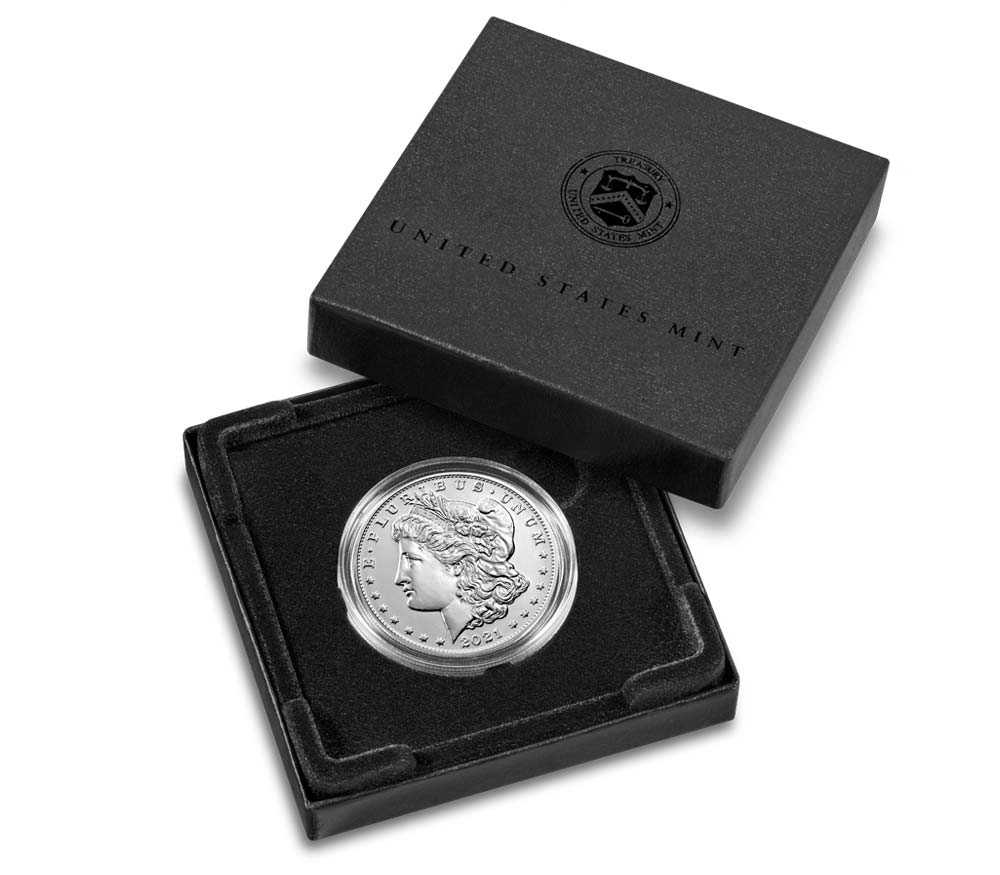
2021 Morgan dollar in a United States Mint display box

On September 22, 2020, the U.S. House of Representatives passed legislation to allow the minting of Morgan and Peace dollar coins in 2021, the 100-year anniversary of the transition from the Morgan to Peace dollar in order to "commemorate this significant evolution of American Freedom".

House Bill 6192 (2021 Silver Dollar Coin Anniversary Act) allows production of Morgan and Silver dollars at 26.73g and no less than 90% silver (24.057 g = 0.7735 ozt). On December 18, 2020, the United States Senate unanimously approved the bill, and it was signed into law by President Donald Trump on January 5, 2021. The Citizens Coinage Advisory Committee unanimously approved the design on January 19, 2021, with recommendations which were sent to the Secretary of the Treasury Steven Mnuchin, one day before the end of the Trump administration. There is no known mintage limit, and mintage could not begin until after January 1, 2021.

The US Mint then released order information for both dollars, priced at $85 (Note: equivalent to $101 in 2025 adjusted for inflation) apiece. Both coins are "0.858 troy oz. of .999 fine silver with an uncirculated finish". Morgan Dollars were made available for purchase in May 2021, and sold out on the U.S. Mint website in 45 minutes, and had a staggered order window based on the different mint marks. Peace Dollars were available beginning later in the same year. Each coin shipped in October 2021. High demand of these coins led to controversy over U.S. Mint ordering procedures and resulted in delays from the originally intended release dates. The 2021 Morgan Dollars were minted in the active mints of Philadelphia (no mint mark), Denver (D), and San Francisco (S). Two-thirds of the Philadelphia-minted dollars contained "privy marks" for the now defunct Carson City (CC) and New Orleans (O) mints. The 2021 Peace Dollars had no mint mark and were only minted in Philadelphia. After the chaos caused by the CC and O dollars, the Household Order Limit was reduced from 10 to 3 for the remainder of the dollars.

The US Mint originally decided to continue the Morgan and Peace Dollar program for 2022 and beyond minted in San Francisco (S) with a proof finish, but on March 14, 2022, announced that the planned 2022 releases had been scrapped due to "supply chain issues, production capacity and shipping logistics", and the rising price of silver, with plans to resume the program in 2023.

For 2023, the US Mint announced plans to release Morgan Dollars in three finishes: Uncirculated, minted by the Philadelphia Mint with no mint mark, 275,000 mintage limit; Proof, minted by the San Francisco Mint with an S mint mark, 400,000 mintage limit; and Reverse Proof, released as part of a 2-coin set with a Peace Dollar, minted by the San Francisco Mint with an S mint mark, 250,000 mintage limit.

The 2023 Uncirculated Morgan Dollar was released by the US Mint on July 13, 2023, and sold out on the first day of issue.

== Mintage figures ==
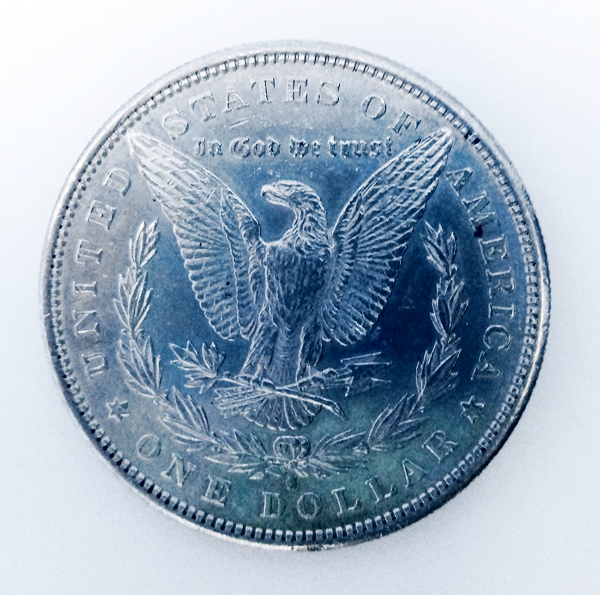
1881 Morgan Dollar Reverse

The dollars were produced every year between 1878 and 1904 at a total of four different mints. Each mint, with the exception of Philadelphia, has its own mint mark. In 1921 production was resumed for one year only, with this year being the only one where the Denver mint was used, until 2021. The number of dollars surviving are unknown as the Pittman Act resulted in the melting of millions of these coins, and the individual dates melted were never recorded. PCGS CoinFacts estimates survivals are less than 10% of the mintage.

Year	Philadelphia	New Orleans	San Francisco	Carson City	Denver
1878	10,508,800		9,774,000	2,212,000	
1879	14,806,000	2,887,000	9,110,000	756,000	
1880	12,600,000	5,305,000	8,900,000	495,000	
1881	9,163,000	5,708,000	12,760,000	296,000	
1882	11,100,000	6,090,000	9,250,000	1,133,000	
1883	12,290,000	8,725,000	6,250,000	1,204,000	
1884	14,070,000	9,730,000	3,200,000	1,136,000	
1885	17,787,000	9,185,000	1,497,000	228,000	
1886	19,963,000	10,710,000	750,000		
1887	20,290,000	11,550,000	1,771,000		
1888	19,183,000	12,150,000	657,000		
1889	21,726,000	11,875,000	700,000	350,000	
1890	16,802,000	10,701,100	8,230,373	2,309,041	
1891	8,693,556	7,954,529	5,296,000	1,618,000	
1892	1,036,000	2,744,000	1,200,000	1,352,000	
1893	378,000	300,000	100,000	677,000	
1894	110,000	1,723,000	1,260,000		
1895	880 (proof only)	450,000	400,000		
1896	9,976,000	4,900,000	5,000,000		
1897	2,822,000	4,004,000	5,825,000		
1898	5,884,000	4,400,000	4,102,000		
1899	330,000	12,290,000	2,562,000		
1900	8,830,000	12,590,000	3,540,000		
1901	6,962,000	13,320,000	2,284,000		
1902	7,994,000	8,636,000	1,530,000		
1903	4,652,000	4,450,000	1,241,000		
1904	2,788,000	3,720,000	2,304,000		
1921	44,690,000		21,695,000		20,345,000
2021	525,000 (Note: 2021 dated Morgan dollars minted at the Philadelphia mint include a third minted with a "CC" privy mark and a third minted with an "O" privy mark, i.e. 175,000 minted of each variety.)		175,000		175,000
2023	273,632		351,135 (proof); 200,585 (reverse proof)		
2024	275,000		262,500		
2025	150,000		180,000		
Total	306,244,979	186,097,629	132,177,593	13,766,041	20,520,000

== See also ==
- VAM (Morgan and Peace dollar die varieties)

== General and cited references ==
- Fite, Emerson David (1919). History of the United States (second ed.). New York City: Henry Holt & Co.
- Julian, R.W. (1993). Bowers, Q. David (ed.). Silver Dollars & Trade Dollars of the United States. Wolfeboro, New Hampshire: Bowers and Merena Galleries. ISBN 0-943161-48-7.
- Van Allen, Leroy C.; Mallis, A. George (1991). Comprehensive Catalog and Encyclopedia of Morgan & Peace Dollars. Virginia Beach, Virginia: DLRC Press. ISBN 978-1-880731-11-6.
- Yeoman, R. S. (2010). A Guide Book of United States Coins (63rd ed.). Atlanta, Georgia: Whitman Publishing. ISBN 978-0-7948-2767-0.

Preceded by Seated Liberty dollar	Dollar coin of the United States (1878–1904, 1921, 2021–present) Concurrent with: Trade dollar (1878–1885); Large Head Indian Gold dollar – Type III (1878–1889); Peace dollar (1921, 2021–present)	Succeeded by Peace dollar
