= 1909-S VDB Lincoln Cent =

Popular and valuable U.S. one-cent coin

- United States
- Value: 0.01 U.S. dollar
- Mass: 3.11 g
- Diameter: 19.05 mm (0.750 in)
- Edge: Plain
- Composition: 95% copper; 2.5% tin; 2.5% zinc
- Years of minting: 1909

Obverse
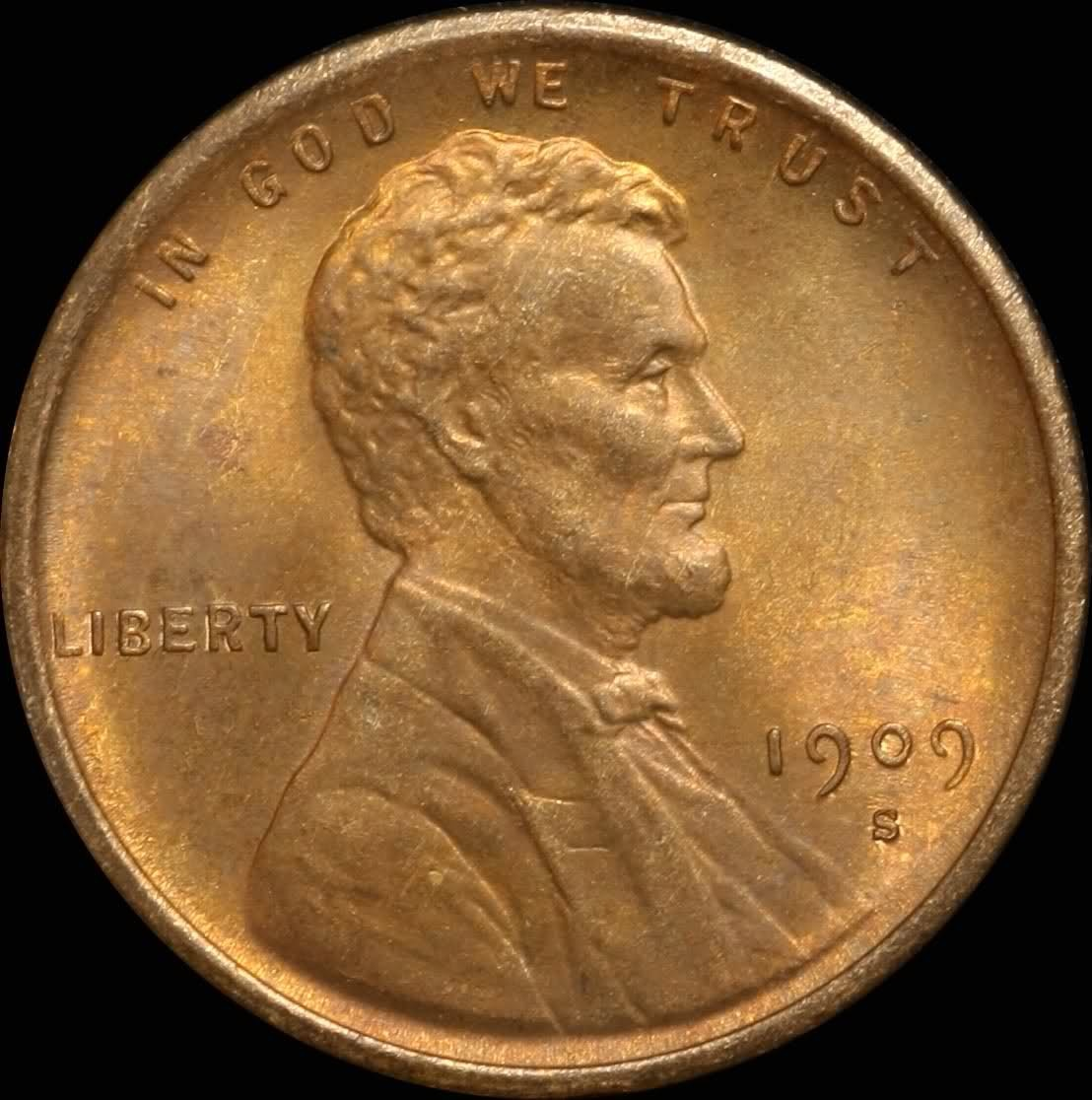
- Design: Abraham Lincoln
- Designer: Victor David Brenner
- Design date: 1909

Reverse
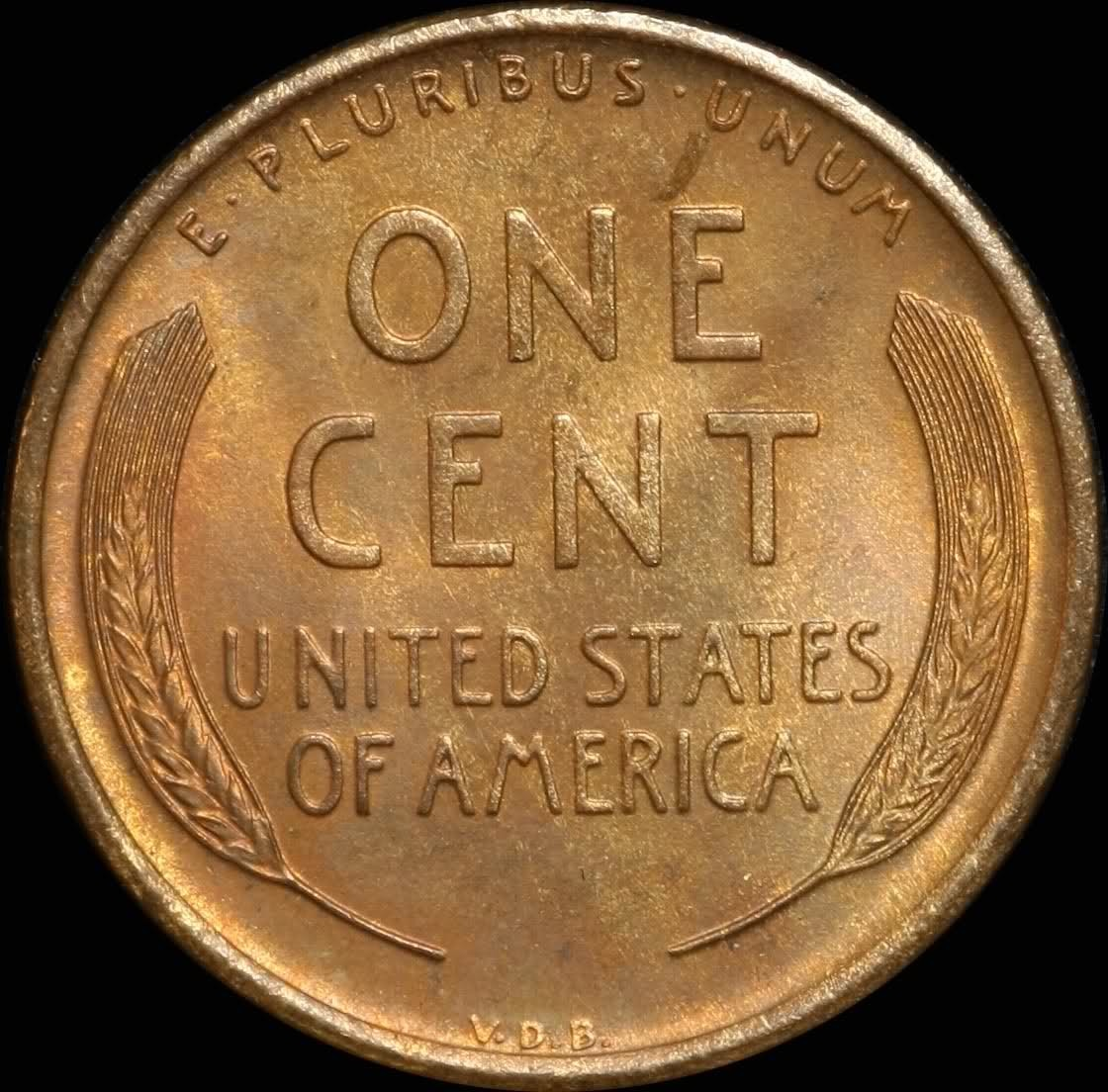
- Design: Wheat heads
- Designer: Victor David Brenner
- Design date: 1909

The 1909-S VDB Lincoln Cent is a low-mintage coin of the United States dollar. It is a key date variety of the one-cent coin produced by the United States Mint in San Francisco in 1909. (Note: "Key date" is a scarce date required to complete a collection, usually more difficult to find and afford. Varieties are fine details of a coin's design which set it apart from the normal issue. Varieties arise as a result of intended or unintended alterations to the basic coin design that occur during the die production stage.) The Lincoln cent replaced the Indian Head cent and was the first everyday U.S. coin to feature a specific real person. It was immediately met with controversy over the inclusion of the initials of the sculptor who designed the coin, Victor David Brenner, on the reverse.

US President Theodore Roosevelt ordered the new design with US President Abraham Lincoln's head to honor Lincoln as the savior of the Union. The coins were to be released on the 100th anniversary of Lincoln's birth, February 12, 1909. The coin was delayed to add the words "In God We Trust" and eventually released August 2, 1909.

Within days of the coin's release, it was discontinued (August 6, 1909) so that Brenner's initials (VDB) could be removed from the dies. The two mints charged with striking the Lincoln cent were the Philadelphia Mint (no mint mark) and the San Francisco Mint (mint mark S). The Philadelphia Mint produced 27,995,000 VDB pennies, but the San Francisco Mint produced only 484,000, which made this variety the rarest of the series.

When Americans heard that the coin was being discontinued, they waited in long lines to get the pennies. People assumed that they would become valuable as souvenirs. In many cities throughout the United States, people went to get quantities of pennies that they could resell. In New York City, police were called in to control the people.

== History ==
Theodore Roosevelt, the 26th U.S. president, thought American coins were common and uninspiring. He had the opportunity to pose for a portrait with a young Lithuanian-born Jewish artist, Victor David Brenner. The artist had become one of the nation's premier medalists. Roosevelt had learned of Brenner's talents in a settlement house on New York City's Lower East Side and was immediately impressed with a Bas-Relief that Brenner had made of Abraham Lincoln, based on a Mathew Brady photograph. Roosevelt revered Abraham Lincoln as the savior of the Union and the greatest Republican president. He ordered the new Lincoln cent to be based on Brenner's work and to be released just in time to commemorate Lincoln's 100th birthday in 1909. The likeness of President Lincoln on the obverse of the coin is an adaptation of a plaque Brenner created several years earlier which had come to the attention of President Roosevelt in New York. The Lincoln penny was the first everyday American coin to feature an actual person.

On January 10, 1909, The Spokesman-Review reported that soon a new design for the penny would be submitted by a "sculptor of prominence". They speculated that the "old-fashioned Indian headdress will probably not be used on the penny." The new pennies were not issued in June when they were expected because the sculptor Victor David Brenner had not put the words "In God We Trust" above the Lincoln head. President William Howard Taft, who assumed office in March 1909, wanted the words to appear on the coin's obverse. This meant that the dies and pennies were delayed until August 1909. The coin was finally released to the public on August 2, 1909, with much fanfare. People got in long lines and waited to get the pennies. Policemen on horseback were called in to control the people. Because of the penny's portrayal of Lincoln many Black-Americans considered it "emancipation money".

== Controversy ==
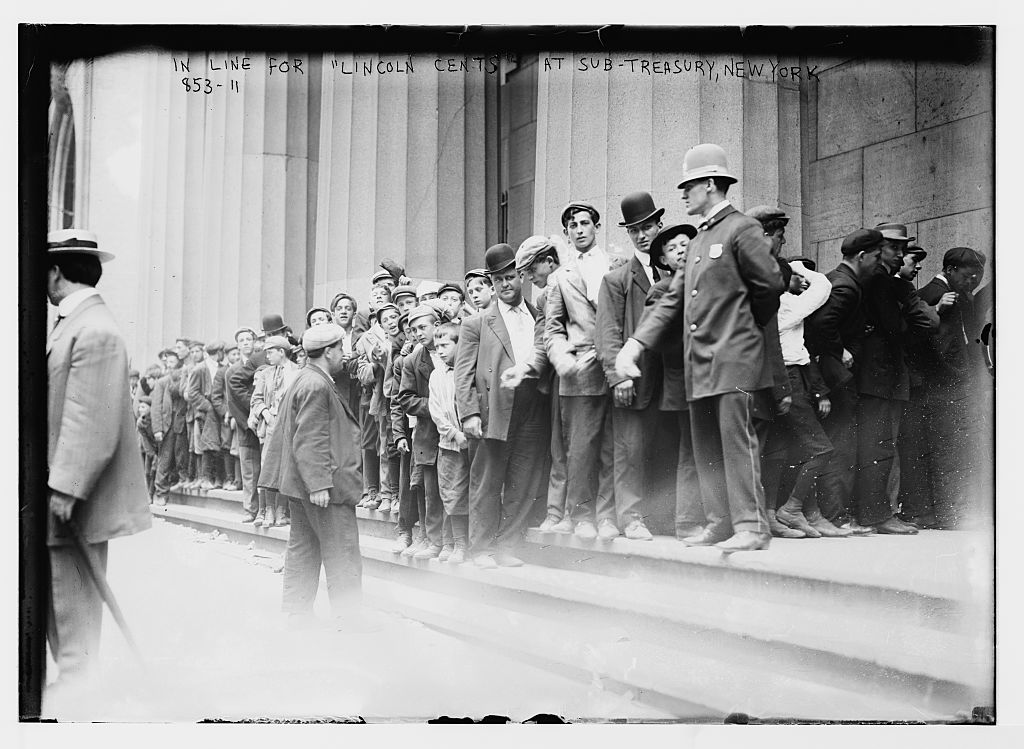
The public lines up to buy Lincoln cents outside the Sub-Treasury building, New York City, August 2, 1909.

On August 6, 1909, The Washington Post proclaimed, "V.D.B. Cent Doomed". The initials and their placement on the coin met with displeasure from the Secretary of the Treasury Franklin MacVeagh who had either not seen the coin's design or did not look at it closely before minting began. The artist (Brenner) told The Washington Post that he would write to the Secretary MacVeagh and demand an explanation. He stated that when the design was accepted, the first dies actually had his full name. On August 6, 1909, The Evening Chronicle in Charlotte, North Carolina, reported that the pennies would be withdrawn and "Treasury Department has already started collectors on the rounds to gather up the pennies and withdraw them from circulation". They also reported that a "limited number" of the pennies were struck in Philadelphia and no more would be made. (Note: The Philadelphia Mint did not use a mint mark on the pennies it produced, while the San Francisco Mint used an "S" for its mint mark.)

=== Speculation ===
After the news about the Lincoln penny change got out on August 5, 1909, the St. Louis Post-Dispatch reported that there was a frenzy in New York as people went to get quantities of pennies that they could save to resell. The rumor was that the penny would be withdrawn. The first to rush for the coins were the newsboys. Soon the pennies were being resold for 25 cents. On August 12, the Alabama Times of Montgomery, Alabama, said there was a high demand for the pennies after people realized that the penny may be withdrawn from circulation. The Lowery Bank was the only bank which was supplied with the pennies and they distributed all of them to a long line of people. News soon reached New York that the mint still had millions of the pennies and they would not withdraw the design. The new information caused the price to go from "25 cents to 20¢, then 15¢, then 10¢, 5¢, then two for 5¢, then par."

On August 11, 1909, W. Lewis and Company took out a large advertisement in The Champaign Daily in Champaign, Illinois, announcing that they had 1000 of the new Lincoln pennies which were "particularly highly prized as pocket pieces and souvenirs" and they would be giving them away free with purchases. On August 13, in York, Pennsylvania, the Luria Rag company took out an advertisement in The York Dispatch stating that they would give Lincoln pennies to customers who purchased rubber shoes or boots for ten days. On August 14, an advertiser in the Evansville Courier in Evansville, Indiana, stated, "Inasmuch as these pennies may be withdrawn from circulation they would at once become valuable as souvenirs. In the September 24, 1909, Pottsville Daily Republican in Pottsville, Pennsylvania, one establishment took out an advertisement announcing that customers would get new pennies for shopping with them. Even though more than 28 million of the coins had been struck, one advertiser in Knoxville, Tennessee, stated that it would be a rare and odd coin. On November 2, 1909, the US Treasury announced that all of the V.D.B. Lincoln coins had passed into public hands.

=== Resolution ===
Brenner's initials were removed from the dies and there was a discussion about using the letter B for the artist's last name. The letter B was already used on silver coins by Charles E. Barber who was the mint's chief engraver so the idea of adding a "B" was rejected. It was not until 1918, when Brenner's initials returned to the coin (this time they were on the obverse) as small letters below Lincoln's shoulder. Charles Barber died in 1917 and there is speculation that he was the one who had opposed the Brenner initials on the coin. There was also a new Treasury Secretary William Gibbs McAdoo (1913) and he was considered more progressive than the previous secretary Franklin MacVeagh.

== Collecting ==
The Lincoln cent or Lincoln penny is also colloquially referred to as a wheat penny because the reverse features two wheat heads. The 1909 penny weighs 3.11 g (0.110 oz) and has a 19 mm (0.75 in) diameter with a plain edge. The composition of the penny is bronze. Its metal composition is 95% copper, 2.5% tin and 2.5% zinc.

Joshua McMorrow-Hernandez, writing for Professional Coin Grading Service (PCGS), stated that the 1909-S VDB Lincoln Cent has long been considered "The Holy Grail" in penny collecting, and collectors have stated that the "1909-S VDB may always be the king of Lincoln Cents". The 1909-S VDB Lincoln cent is considered to be a key date for the Lincoln cent series due to its low mintage of only 484,000. The US Mint also produced 27,995,000 1909 (no mint mark) Lincoln pennies at its Philadelphia facility. In 2019, Heritage Auctions sold a 1909-S VDB cent graded at MS67 (i.e. mint condition) for $50,400. Also writing for Coinage Magazine he stated "... it's hard to deny that the 1909-S VDB Lincoln cent is one of most important coins in American numismatics". Though it is not the lowest mintage or the most expensive of the series, it serves as an important and well-known key-date. The 1909-S VDB became instantly collectable on the news of its cancellation, and more than 100 years later, it is still considered a numismatic rarity. The authors of the 2005 book 100 Greatest U.S. Coins have ranked the 1909 S as the 14th most collectible U.S. coin.

== See also ==
- Coin collecting
- Numismatics
- Lincoln cent mintage figures
