= Key date =

Hard-to-find coin in a series

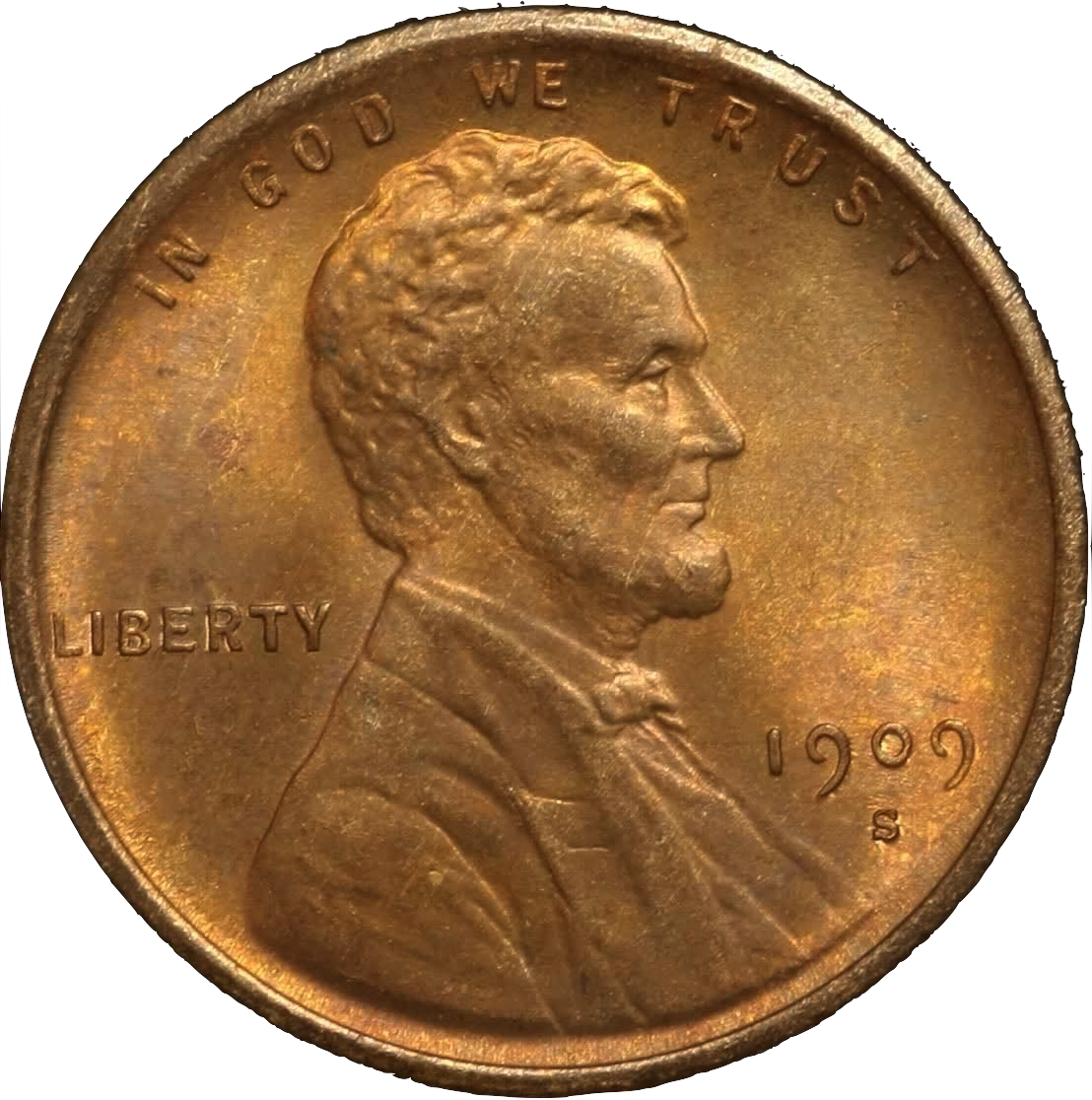
A 1909-S VDB Lincoln Cent

A key date is a term used in coin collecting and it refers to a date (or date and mint mark combination) of a given coin series or coin set that is harder to obtain than other dates in the series. A key date coin is usually one with a lower mintage total and it is more valuable than others in the series. Many coin collectors collect coins to fill out a complete set of a series.

There are also semi-key dates in coin collecting. A semi-key date coin is typically one that is not as rare as the key date. The semi-key date often sells for a premium over common date coins, but less than the cost of a key date coin.

== Background ==
A key date is the term for a coin which is scarcer and harder to obtain in a series. Often coins with certain years or Mint marks are key date coins. Some factors that influence whether a coin is a key date include: demand, quantity of coins struck, the population of surviving examples and rarity of mint state examples. The cost of the key date coins in a series are usually the most expensive to obtain. The coins are also often referred to as the rarest in a series.

Key dates are an important component of coin collecting because many collectors collect coins which fill a coin set: key date coins are the most important. They are valued by collectors because they are needed to complete coin sets.

For the United States collectors of the Lincoln cent series, the 1909-S VDB Lincoln Cent is the rarest and most expensive of cents. The 1909-S VDB Lincoln cent is considered to be a key date due to its low mintage of only 484,000.

The United States 1893-S Morgan dollar is known as the key date in the Morgan series. The 1893-S Morgan dollars were struck at the United States San Francisco Mint. Only 100,000 coins were struck making it the lowest mintage of any business strike Morgan Dollar.

== Semi-key date ==
The next level of difficult to obtain coins in series are often referred to as semi-key dates or simply semi-keys. The semi-key date coins are scarce and sell for a premium but they are not as scarce and rare as a key date. There are not rules which determine which coins are semi-key dates. Some coin collectors the coins in the series with lower mintage figures to be semi-key dates.

== Counterfeits ==
Numismatic Guaranty Company (NGC) produced a list of counterfeited coins: many of them are key date coins. One of the most common methods of counterfeiting involves adding a mintmark to the coin, in order to turn it into a key date coin.
