= Coin set =

Set of collected coins

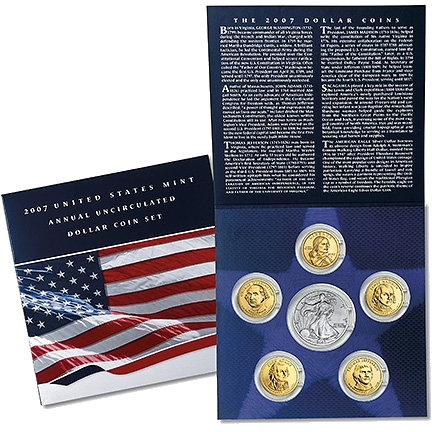
Set of 2007 $1 coins from the United States Mint

A coin set, or mint set, is a collection of uncirculated or proof coins, released by a mint. Such sets are usually released annually and often called a year set. They include sets of all the circulating coins of that year, as well as sets of commemorative coins.

== Mint sets ==
The Royal Mint, Royal Australian Mint, Royal Canadian Mint, United States Mint and others mints all release sets of proof and uncirculated coins each year.

Occasionally the coins for annual mint sets are struck with special coin dies. For example, the Danmarks Nationalbank issues a coin set each year with coins that are "much more clearly embossed than the ordinary coins in circulation."

Early coin sets were issued in paper or cardboard folders which often led to toning, due to the sulphur content of the card.

== Coin collector sets ==
The Numismatic Guaranty Company allows coin collectors to build coin sets with graded coins. Collectors post images on their web site. Many collectors collect coins which fill a coin set. There are coins in each series or set which are known as key date coins. They are valued by collectors because they are needed to complete coin sets.

== See also ==
- United States Mint coin sets
