= Anna Willess Williams =

American philosopher (1857–1926)

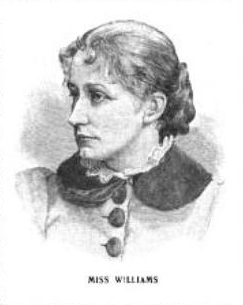
- Anna Willess Williams, depicted in 1892
- Born: Anna Willess Williams; August 15, 1857
- Died: April 17, 1926 (aged 68)
- Known for: Model for George T. Morgan's silver dollar

Anna Willess Williams (August 15, 1857 – April 17, 1926) was a teacher and philosophical writer best known as the model for George T. Morgan's silver dollar design, popularly known as the Morgan dollar.

== Morgan dollar ==
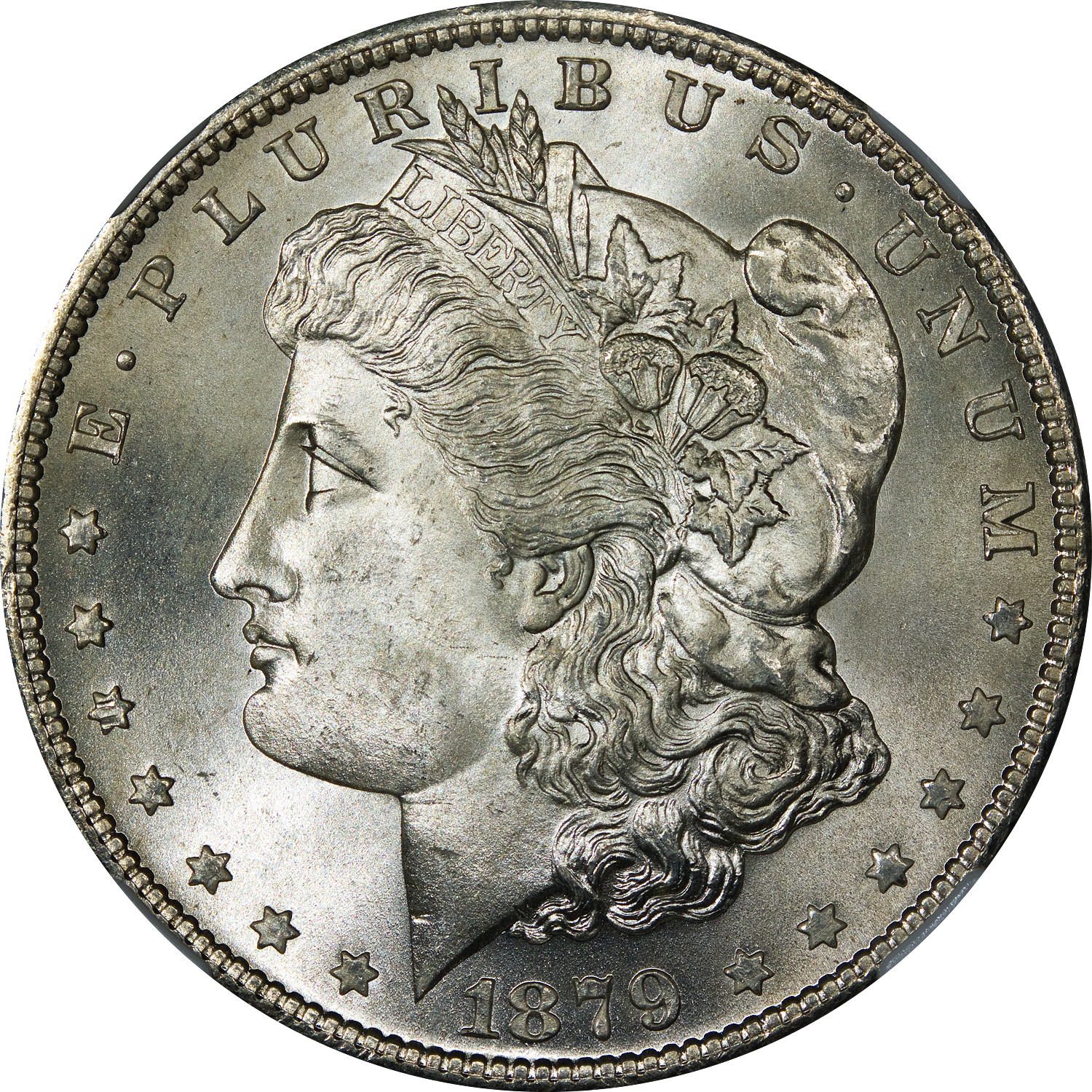
1879 Morgan dollar

In 1876, George T. Morgan began creating a series of new coin designs at the behest of Director of the Mint, Dr. Henry R. Linderman. Morgan opted to use the profile of an American girl to depict the Goddess of Liberty instead of simply creating an imaginary figure for the obverse of his new design. After he rejected several possible candidates, Morgan's friend, artist Thomas Eakins, recommended Anna Williams of Philadelphia. Eakins knew Williams through her father, Henry Williams, and she had posed for several of Eakins's paintings.

Williams reluctantly sat for five modelling sessions with Morgan in November 1876 after being convinced to do so by friends. Morgan was impressed with her profile, stating that it was the most perfect he had seen in England or America. The silver dollar bearing her likeness was first struck on March 11, 1878. A condition of her sitting for Morgan was that her identity be kept secret, but the subject of the portrait was revealed to be Williams shortly after the dollar was released. Williams was troubled by her newly acquired fame, receiving thousands of letters and visits at both her home and workplace. Williams preferred not to talk about her modelling work with Morgan, dismissing it as an "incident of my youth".

== Personal life ==
Despite being offered acting jobs, Williams worked as a teacher until her retirement in 1924. She left her job as principal at a girls' house-of-refuge school to become a teacher of kindergarten philosophy at a girls' normal school. Though she was once engaged to an unknown suitor, Williams died, unmarried, on April 17, 1926.

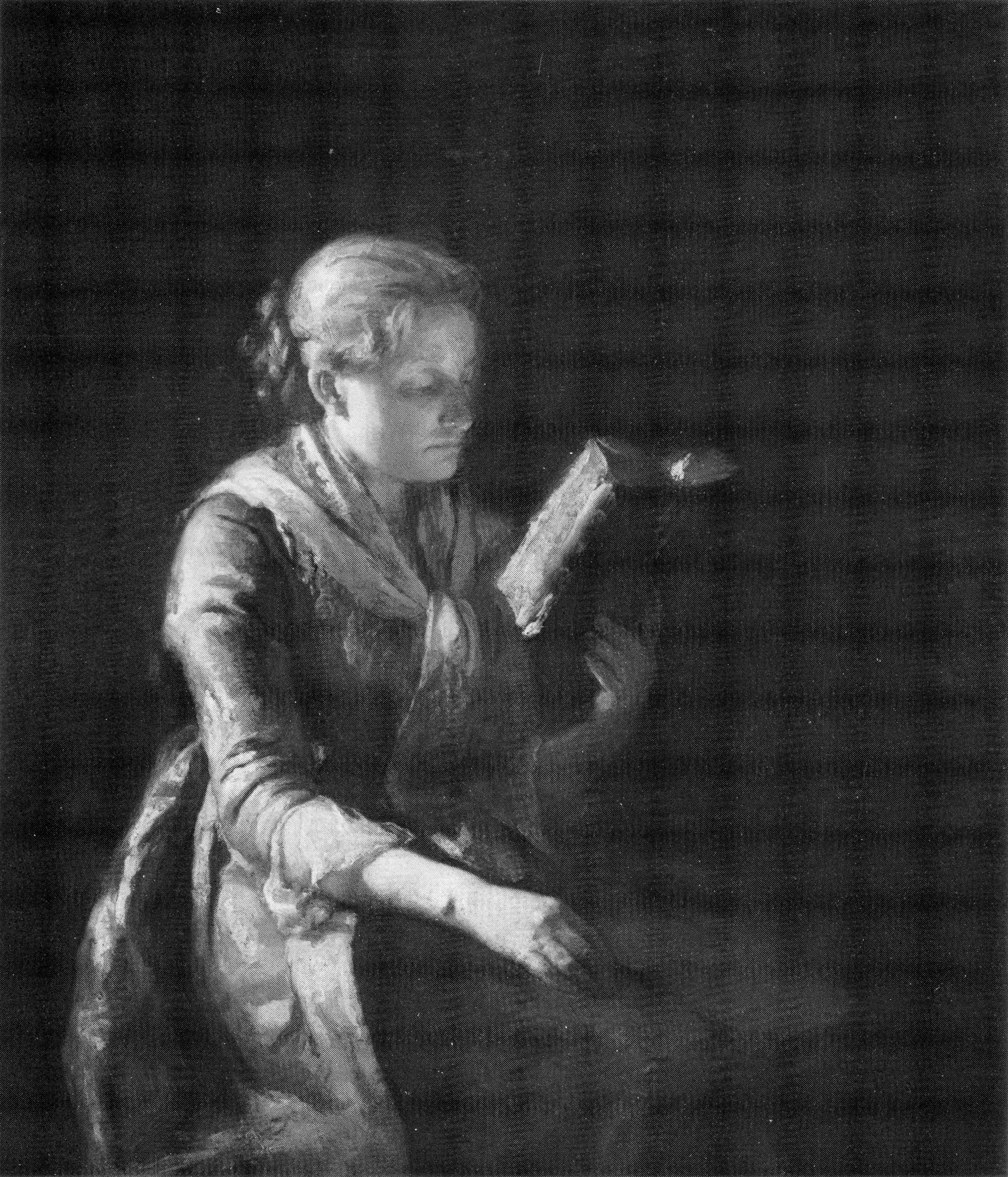
Portrait of Anna Williams (c.1878) by Thomas Eakins, private collection

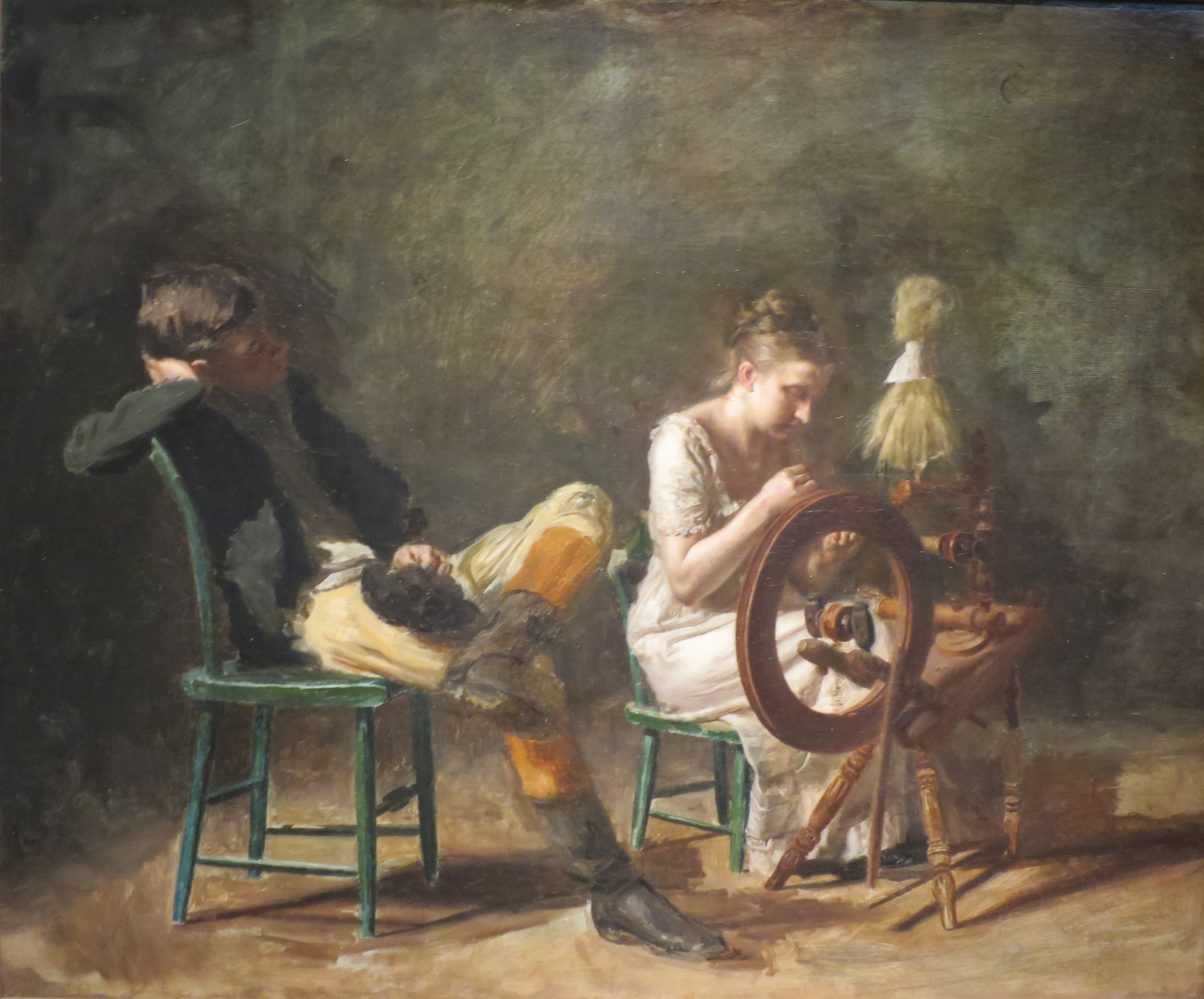
The Courtship (1878) by Thomas Eakins, Worcester Art Museum

== Bibliography ==
Van Allen, Leroy C. & Mallis, A. George (1991). Comprehensive Catalog and Encyclopedia of Morgan & Peace Dollars. Virginia Beach, Virginia: DLRC Press. ISBN 1-880731-11-8.
