= George T. Morgan =

American engraver (1845–1925)

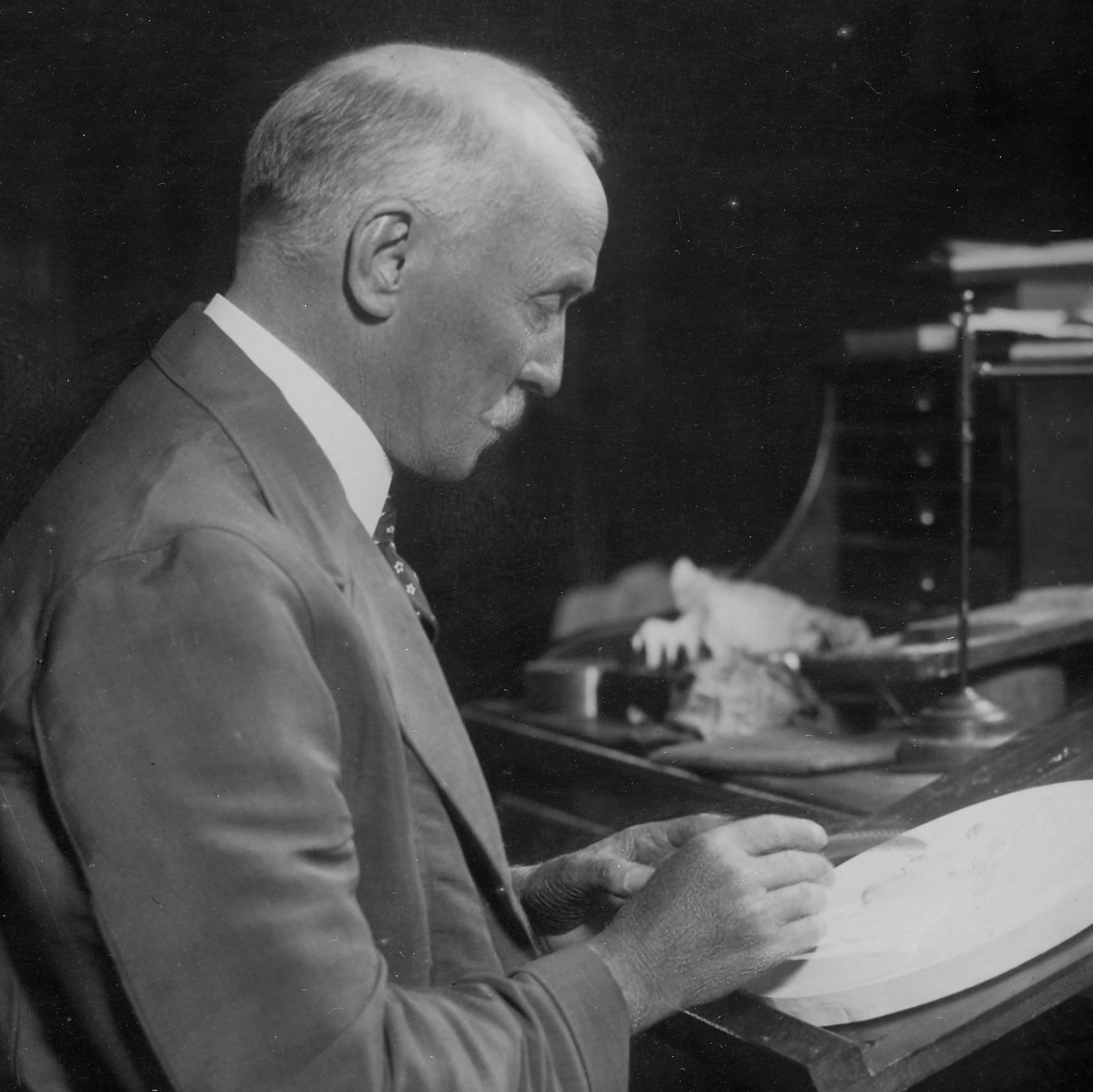
- George T. Morgan

Chief Engraver of the United States Mint
- In office 1917–1925
- Preceded by: Charles E. Barber
- Succeeded by: John R. Sinnock

Personal details
- Born: November 24, 1845 Bilston, England
- Died: January 4, 1925 (aged 79) Germantown, Philadelphia, U.S.
- Children: 3
- Occupation: Engraver

George Thomas Morgan (November 24, 1845 – January 4, 1925) was a United States Mint engraver who is famous for designing many popular coins, such as the Morgan dollar, the reverse of the Columbian Exposition half dollar, and the reverse of the McKinley Birthplace Memorial gold dollar.

== Early life ==
Morgan was born in Bilston, England, and educated at an art school in the neighboring city of Birmingham, before winning a scholarship to study at the National Art Training School. After his education, he took up employment under John Pinches, where he worked between 1873-1875, as a die engraver.

== Career ==
He came to the United States in 1876 and was hired as an assistant engraver at the Mint in October under William Barber. He figured very prominently in the production of pattern coins from 1877 onward, and designed several varieties of 1877 half dollars, the 1879 Schoolgirl dollar, and the 1882 "Shield Earring" coins. He became the seventh Chief Engraver of the United States Mint following the death of Charles E. Barber in February 1917.

Morgan is most famous for designing the Morgan dollar, one of many namesakes, as well as the never-released $100 Gold Union coin.

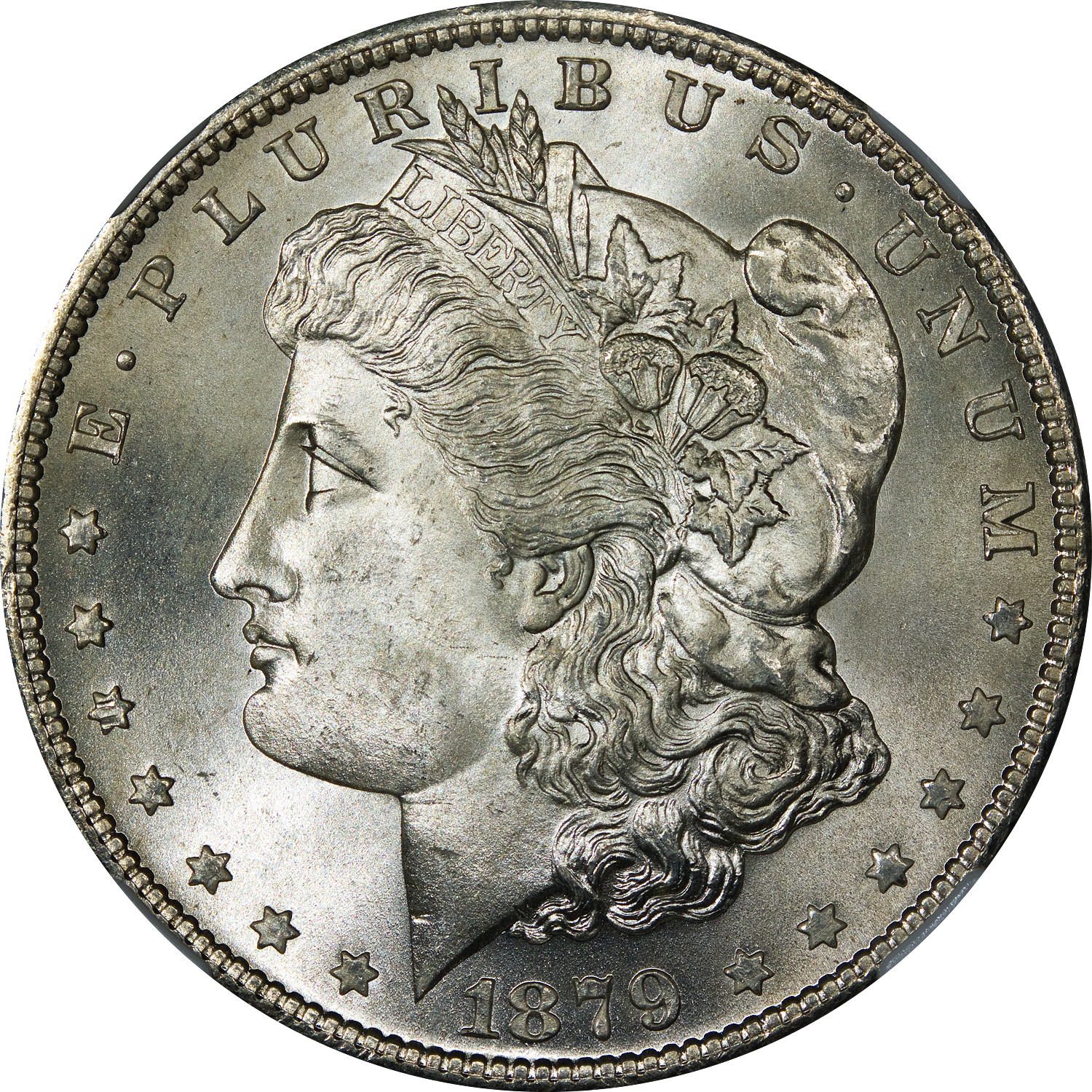
The Morgan silver dollar, designed in 1876, features an image of the Goddess of Liberty modeled by Anna Willess Williams

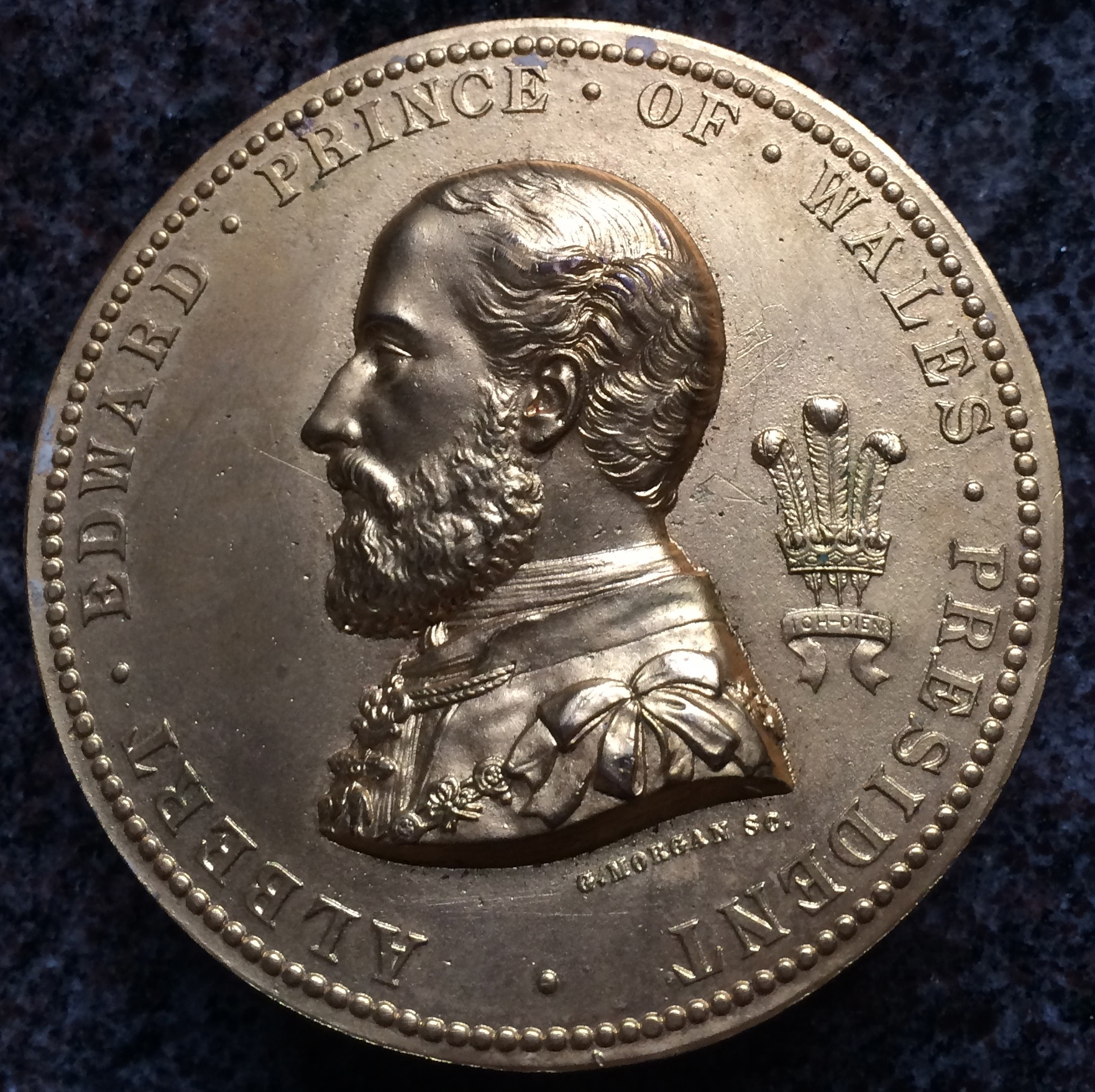
Morgan medal depicting Edward VII, c. 1875

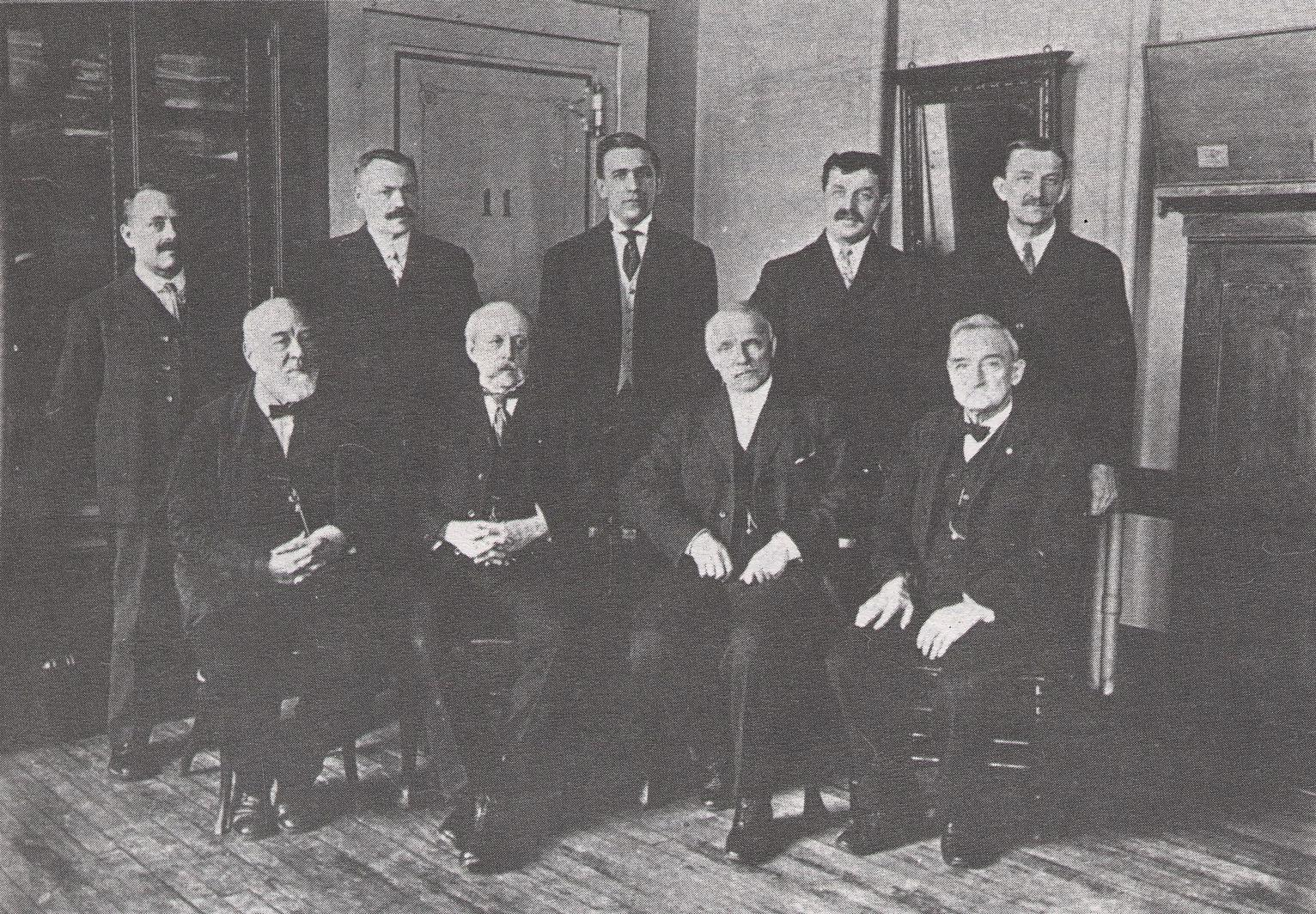
A photograph of the Mint engravers. Morgan is seated in the front row, second from right.

== Personal life ==
Morgan married Alice Louisa Pearce in 1874 and had three children, Beatrice, Leonard Pearce (1877-1961) and Phyllis (1884-?). He died on January 4, 1925, at his son-in-law's home in Germantown, Philadelphia.

Government offices
Preceded by Charles E. Barber	Chief Engraver of the United States Mint; 1917–1925	Succeeded by John R. Sinnock
