= Pittman Act =

1918 United States federal law

- Long title: An Act To conserve the gold supply of the United States; to permit the settlement in silver of trade balances adverse to the United States; to provide silver for subsidiary coinage and for commercial use; to assist foreign governments at war with the enemies of the United States; and for the above purposes to stabilize the price and encourage the production of silver.
- Enacted by: the 65th United States Congress
- Effective: April 23, 1918

Citations
- Public law: Pub. L. 65-139
- Statutes at Large: USS 40 (535)

Codification
- Acts amended: Federal Reserve Act

Legislative history
- Introduced in the Senate as S. 4292 by Key Pittman (D-NV) on April 1918; Passed the Senate on April 18, 1918; Passed the House on April 22, 1918; Signed into law by President Woodrow Wilson on April 23, 1918

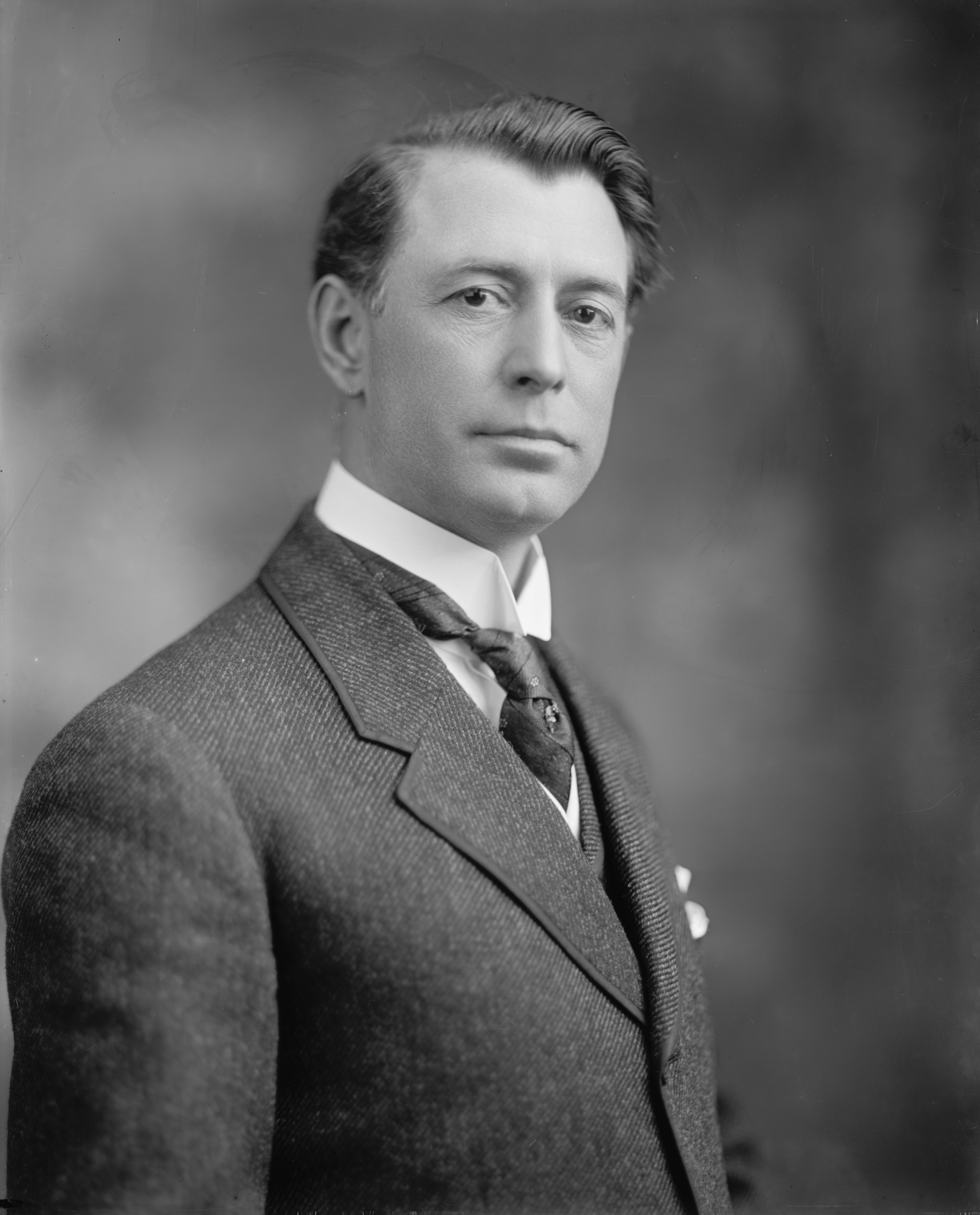
United States of America, Senator Key Pittman

The Pittman Act was a United States federal law sponsored by Senator Key Pittman of Nevada and enacted on April 23, 1918. The Act authorized the conversion of up to 350,000,000 standard silver dollars into bullion and its sale or use for subsidiary silver coinage, and directed purchase of domestic silver for recoinage of a like number of dollars. For each silver dollar converted into bullion, the Act also called for the temporary removal from circulation of an equivalent value of Silver Certificates. These certificates were to be temporarily replaced with a new issuance of Federal Reserve Bank Notes, including $1 and $2 denominations for the first time.

Under the Act, 270,232,722 standard silver dollars were converted into bullion (259,121,554 for sale to Great Britain at $1.00 per fine ounce, plus mint charges, and 11,111,168 for subsidiary silver coinage), the equivalent of about 209,000,000 fine ounces of silver. Between 1920 and 1933, under the Pittman Act, the same quantity of silver was purchased from the output of American mines, at a fixed price of $1 per ounce, from which 270,232,722 standard silver dollars were recoined. The fixed price of $1 per ounce was above the market rate and acted as a federal subsidy to the silver mining industry.

The passage of the Pittman Act led to most coins of lesser value having much lower mintages in 1921, and no mintages at all, in 1922 — echoing what happened after the Bland-Allison Act of 1878 was passed, which also resumed the coinage of silver dollars.

Further provisions relating to silver coinage were contained in the Thomas Amendment to the Agricultural Adjustment Act of 1933.

== See also ==
- Executive Order 6102
- Executive Order 6814
