= Circulation issue =

Coin minted and issued for commerce

A circulation issue or circulation coin, sometimes called a business strike (US), is a coin minted and issued for commerce as opposed to those made as commemorative coins and proof coins. Circulation issue coins are normally produced in relatively large numbers, and are primarily meant to be used as pocket change, not collected. But after their withdrawal from circulation, these coins are highly valued by collectors, especially coins of high quality and without traces of use in trade. Preserved circulation coins are one of the primary sources by which scientists reconstruct the culture, history, and society of the time in which they were used.

Even though special collector coins, such as proof coinage, are produced in smaller numbers, the circulation issue coins are sometimes more valuable in high grade than their proof counterparts. This is because whereas proof coins are almost always carefully preserved by their owners, circulation issue usually are not.

== Officially "unissued" circulation coins ==
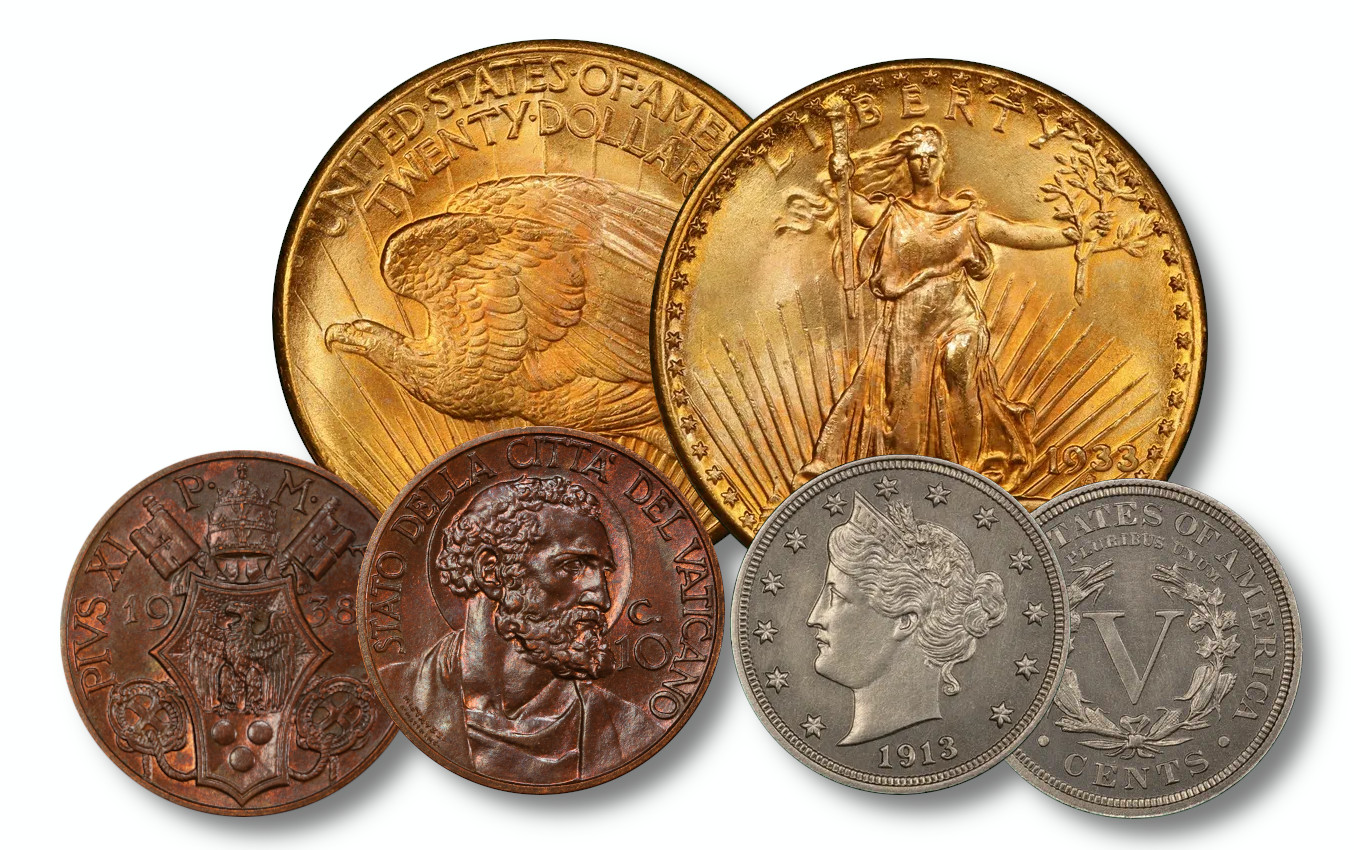
10 centesimi 1938 Vatican City, 20 dollars 1933 US, 5 cent 1913 US

The state strictly controls the issuance of coins at mints to prevent counterfeit money's distribution. However, collectors find coins that are not listed in the mint records or indicate that the mintage of these coins was destroyed. These coins are especially valuable to numismatists, as each one is associated with a unique story:

=== 5 cent 1913 Liberty Head nickel US ===
The United States Mint's official records list no Liberty Head nickels produced that year. However, in December 1919, a previously unknown 1913 Liberty Head nickel was shown at a meeting of the Chicago Coin Club. The circumstances behind their creation are unknown. Only five examples exist. The finest known 1913 Liberty Head Nickel was auctioned in August 2018 at ANA U.S. Stacks Bowers Auction for $4,560,000,

=== 10 centesimi 1938 Vatican City ===
Officially, the coin is "unissued." and does not appear in the Mint of Rome's records. Due to the death of Pope Pius XI, the circulation coins with the Pope's name of 1938 were not issued, and only thanks to the passionate collector Victor Emmanuel III, King of Italy, was this coin saved. Eight coins have been graded and certified by professional grading services (PCGS, NGC), and the finest known, with a grade of MS65, has never been offered for sale,

=== 20 dollar 1933 double eagle US ===
Although the Mint records clearly show that no 1933 double eagles were issued, there were allegedly three weeks in March 1933 when 445,500 specimens were minted, none were ever officially circulated, and all but two were ordered to be melted down. These two coins should have been the only 1933 double eagle coins in existence. However, unknown to the mint, a number of the coins were stolen. Now known only 14 specimens, only one of which is privately owned. This coin with a grade of MS65 was auctioned at Sotheby's 8 June 2021 auction for $18,872,250,

These are examples of the most coveted rarities circulation coins in numismatics.
