= Washington quarter mintage figures =

Markings on a US quarter coin

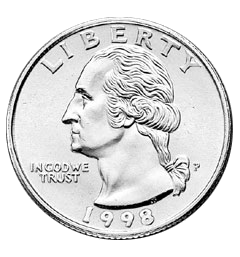
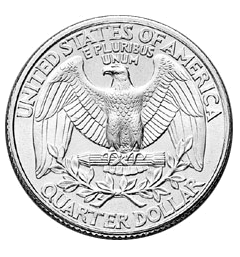
Washington quarter

Below are the mintage figures for the Washington quarter.

The following mint marks indicate which mint the coin was made at (parentheses indicate a lack of a mint mark):

P = Philadelphia Mint

D = Denver Mint

S = San Francisco Mint

== Eagle reverse (1932–1974) ==
=== Silver ===
Eagle reverse, 1932–1964 (Silver)
Year	Mint	Mintage	Comments
1932	(P)	5,404,000	
1932	D	436,800	
1932	S	408,000	
1934	(P)	31,912,052	Doubled die errors are known.
1934	D	3,527,200	
1935	(P)	32,484,000	
1935	D	5,780,000	
1935	S	5,660,000	
1936	(P)	41,300,000	
1936	D	5,374,000	
1936	S	3,828,000	
1936	(P)	3,837	Proof
1937	(P)	19,696,000	Doubled die errors are known.
1937	D	7,189,600	
1937	S	1,652,000	
1937	(P)	5,542	Proof
1938	(P)	9,472,000	
1938	S	2,832,000	
1938	(P)	8,045	Proof
1939	(P)	33,540,000	
1939	D	7,092,000	
1939	S	2,628,000	
1939	(P)	8,795	Proof
1940	(P)	35,704,000	
1940	D	2,797,600	
1940	S	8,244,000	
1940	(P)	11,246	Proof
1941	(P)	79,032,000	
1941	D	16,714,800	
1941	S	16,080,000	
1941	(P)	15,287	Proof
1942	(P)	102,096,000	
1942	D	17,487,200	Doubled die errors are known.
1942	S	19,384,000	
1942	(P)	21,123	Proof
1943	(P)	99,700,000	Doubled die errors are known.
1943	D	16,095,600	
1943	S	21,700,000	Doubled die errors are known.
1944	(P)	104,956,000	
1944	D	14,600,800	
1944	S	12,560,000	
1945	(P)	74,372,000	
1945	D	12,341,600	
1945	S	17,004,001	
1946	(P)	53,436,000	
1946	D	9,072,800	
1946	S	4,204,000	
1947	(P)	22,556,000	
1947	D	15,388,000	
1947	S	5,532,000	
1948	(P)	35,196,000	
1948	D	16,766,800	
1948	S	15,960,000	
1949	(P)	9,312,000	
1949	D	10,068,400	
1950	(P)	24,920,126	
1950	D	21,075,600	D over S overmark errors are known.
1950	S	10,284,004	S over D overmark errors are known.
1950	(P)	51,386	Proof
1951	(P)	43,448,102	
1951	D	35,354,800	
1951	S	9,048,000	
1951	(P)	57,500	Proof
1952	(P)	38,780,093	
1952	D	49,795,200	
1952	S	13,707,800	
1952	(P)	81,980	Proof
1953	(P)	18,536,120	
1953	D	56,112,400	
1953	S	14,016,000	
1953	(P)	128,800	Proof
1954	(P)	54,412,203	
1954	D	42,305,500	
1954	S	11,834,722	
1954	(P)	233,300	Proof
1955	(P)	18,180,181	
1955	D	3,182,400	
1955	(P)	378,200	Proof
1956	(P)	44,144,000	
1956	D	32,334,500	
1956	(P)	669,384	Proof
1957	(P)	46,532,000	
1957	D	77,924,160	
1957	(P)	1,247,952	Proof
1958	(P)	6,360,000	
1958	D	78,124,900	
1958	(P)	875,652	Proof
1959	(P)	24,384,000	
1959	D	62,054,232	
1959	(P)	1,149,291	Proof
1960	(P)	29,164,000	
1960	D	63,000,324	
1960	(P)	1,691,602	Proof
1961	(P)	37,036,000	
1961	D	83,656,928	
1961	(P)	3,028,244	Proof
1962	(P)	36,156,000	
1962	D	127,554,756	
1962	(P)	3,218,019	Proof
1963	(P)	74,316,000	
1963	D	135,288,184	
1963	(P)	3,075,645	Proof
1964	(P)	560,390,585	Continued to be struck until 1966
1964	D	704,135,528	Continued to be struck until 1966
1964	(P)	3,950,762	Proof
1964	(S)	≈20-50	Satin finish, Special Mint Set

=== Clad ===
Eagle reverse, 1965–1974 (Nickel-clad copper)
Year	Mint	Mintage	Comments
1965	(P)	1,819,717,540	
1965	(D)	^	
1965	(S)	^	
1965	(S)	2,360,000	Satin finish, Special Mint Set
1966	(P)	821,101,500	
1966	(D)	^	
1966	(S)	^	
1966	(S)	2,261,583	Satin finish, Special Mint Set
1967	(P)	1,524,031,848	
1967	(D)	^	
1967	(S)	^	
1967	(S)	1,863,344	Satin finish, Special Mint Set
1968	(P)	220,731,500	
1968	D	101,534,000	
1968	S	3,041,506	Proof only
1969	(P)	176,212,000	
1969	D	114,372,000	
1969	S	2,934,631	Proof only
1970	(P)	136,420,000	
1970	D	417,341,364	
1970	S	2,632,810	Proof only
1971	(P)	109,284,000	
1971	D	258,634,428	
1971	S	3,220,733	Proof only
1972	(P)	215,048,000	
1972	D	311,067,732	
1972	S	3,260,996	Proof only
1973	(P)	346,924,000	
1973	D	232,977,400	
1973	S	2,760,339	Proof only
1974	(P)	801,456,000	
1974	D	353,160,300	
1974	S	2,612,568	Proof only

== Bicentennial reverse (1976) ==
Bicentennial reverse, 1976 (Nickel-clad copper unless otherwise noted)
Year	Mint	Mintage	Comments
1976	(P)	809,784,016	Struck in 1975 and 1976
1976	D	860,118,839	Struck in 1975 and 1976
1976	S	4,908,319	Uncirculated, silver-clad copper
1976	S	2,845,450	Proof, struck in 1975
1976	S	4,149,730	Proof, struck in 1976
1976	S	3,998,621	Proof, silver-clad copper
1976	(P)	c3-4	Pattern, silver-clad copper

== Eagle reverse (1977–1998) ==
Eagle reverse, 1977–1998 (Nickel-clad copper unless otherwise noted)
Year	Mint	Mintage	Comments
1977	(P)	468,556,000	
1977	(W)	^	First time West Point produced the quarter
1977	D	256,524,978	
1977	S	3,251,152	Proof only
1978	(P)	521,452,000	
1978	(W)	^	
1978	D	287,373,152	
1978	S	3,127,781	Proof only
1979	(P)	518,708,000	
1979	(W)	^	
1979	D	489,789,780	
1979	S	3,677,175	Proof only
1980	P	635,832,000	First time the P mint mark was used on the quarter
1980	D	518,327,487	
1980	S	3,554,806	Proof only
1981	P	601,716,000	
1981	D	575,722,833	
1981	S	4,063,083	Proof only
1982	P	500,931,000	
1982	D	480,042,788	
1982	S	3,857,479	Proof only
1983	P	673,535,000	
1983	D	617,806,446	
1983	S	3,279,126	Proof only
1984	P	676,545,000	
1984	D	546,483,064	
1984	S	3,065,110	Proof only
1985	P	775,818,962	
1985	D	519,962,888	
1985	S	3,362,821	Proof only
1986	P	551,199,333	
1986	D	504,298,660	
1986	S	3,010,497	Proof only
1987	P	582,499,481	
1987	D	655,594,696	
1987	S	4,227,728	Proof only
1988	P	562,052,000	
1988	D	596,810,688	
1988	S	3,262,948	Proof only
1989	P	512,868,000	
1989	D	896,535,597	
1989	S	3,220,194	Proof only
1990	P	613,792,000	
1990	D	927,638,181	
1990	S	3,299,559	Proof only
1991	P	570,968,000	
1991	D	630,966,693	
1991	S	2,867,787	Proof only
1992	P	384,764,000	
1992	D	389,777,107	
1992	S	2,858,981	Proof
1992	S	1,317,579	Silver proof
1993	P	639,276,000	
1993	D	645,476,128	
1993	S	2,633,439	Proof
1993	S	761,353	Silver proof
1994	P	825,600,000	
1994	D	880,034,110	
1994	S	2,484,594	Proof
1994	S	785,329	Silver proof
1995	P	1,004,336,000	
1995	D	1,103,216,000	
1995	S	2,117,496	Proof
1995	S	679,985	Silver proof
1996	P	925,040,000	
1996	D	906,868,000	
1996	S	1,750,244	Proof
1996	S	775,021	Silver proof
1997	P	595,740,000	
1997	D	599,680,000	
1997	S	1,975,000	Proof
1997	S	741,678	Silver proof
1998	P	896,268,000	
1998	D	821,000,000	
1998	S	2,086,507	Proof
1998	S	878,792	Silver proof

== District of Columbia and United States Territories quarters (2009) ==
=== District of Columbia ===
District of Columbia reverse, 2009 (Nickel-clad copper unless otherwise noted)
Year	Mint	Mintage	Comments
2009	P	83,600,000	
2009	D	88,800,000	
2009	S	2,113,390	Proof
2009	S	993,589	Silver proof

=== Puerto Rico ===
Puerto Rico reverse, 2009 (Nickel-clad copper unless otherwise noted)
Year	Mint	Mintage	Comments
2009	P	53,000,000	
2009	D	86,000,000	
2009	S	2,113,390	Proof
2009	S	993,589	Silver proof

=== Guam ===
Guam reverse, 2009 (Nickel-clad copper unless otherwise noted)
Year	Mint	Mintage	Comments
2009	P	45,000,000	
2009	D	42,600,000	
2009	S	2,113,390	Proof
2009	S	993,589	Silver proof

=== American Samoa ===
American Samoa reverse, 2009 (Nickel-clad copper unless otherwise noted)
Year	Mint	Mintage	Comments
2009	P	42,600,000	
2009	D	39,600,000	
2009	S	2,113,390	Proof
2009	S	993,589	Silver proof

=== US Virgin Islands ===
US Virgin Islands reverse, 2009 (Nickel-clad copper unless otherwise noted)
Year	Mint	Mintage	Comments
2009	P	41,000,000	
2009	D	41,000,000	
2009	S	2,113,390	Proof
2009	S	993,589	Silver proof

=== Northern Mariana Islands ===
Northern Mariana Islands reverse, 2009 (Nickel-clad copper unless otherwise noted)
Year	Mint	Mintage	Comments
2009	P	35,200,000	
2009	D	37,600,000	
2009	S	2,113,390	Proof
2009	S	993,589	Silver proof

== Washington Crossing the Delaware quarter (2021) ==
Washington Crossing the Delaware quarter

=== Washington Crossing the Delaware ===
Washington Crossing the Delaware reverse, 2021 (Nickel-clad copper unless otherwise noted)
Year	Mint	Mintage	Comments
2021	P	838,400,000	
2021	D	865,400,000	
2021	S	512,798	Proof
2021	S	350,891	Silver proof

== See also ==
- United States cent mintage figures
  - Lincoln cent mintage figures
- United States nickel mintage figures
- Roosevelt dime mintage figures
- United States quarter mintage figures
  - 50 State quarter mintage figures
  - America the Beautiful quarter mintage figures
  - American Women quarters
- United States half dollar mintage figures
  - Kennedy half dollar mintage figures
- American Silver Eagle mintage figures
