= America the Beautiful quarter mintage figures =

Mintage figures for the America the Beautiful quarter program

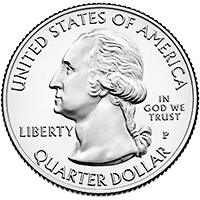
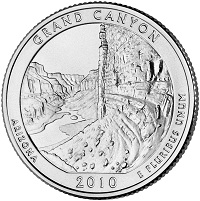
Grand Canyon America the Beautiful quarter

Below are the mintage figures for the America the Beautiful quarters and America the Beautiful silver bullion coins.

The following mint marks indicate which mint the coin was made at (parentheses indicate a lack of a mint mark):

P = Philadelphia Mint

D = Denver Mint

S = San Francisco Mint

W = West Point Mint

== 2010 quarters ==
=== Hot Springs (Arkansas) ===
Hot Springs reverse, 2010 (Nickel-clad copper unless otherwise noted)
Year	Mint	Mintage	Comments
2010	P	35,600,000	
2010	D	34,000,000	
2010	S	1,401,903	Proof
2010	S	859,435	Silver proof
2010	(P)	33,000	Silver bullion
2010	P	27,000	Silver bullion, uncirculated

=== Yellowstone (Wyoming) ===
Yellowstone reverse, 2010 (Nickel-clad copper unless otherwise noted)
Year	Mint	Mintage	Comments
2010	P	33,600,000	
2010	D	34,800,000	
2010	S	1,402,756	Proof
2010	S	859,435	Silver proof
2010	(P)	33,000	Silver bullion
2010	P	27,000	Silver bullion, uncirculated

=== Yosemite (California) ===
Yosemite reverse, 2010 (Nickel-clad copper unless otherwise noted)
Year	Mint	Mintage	Comments
2010	P	35,200,000	
2010	D	34,800,000	
2010	S	1,400,215	Proof
2010	S	859,435	Silver proof
2010	(P)	33,000	Silver bullion
2010	P	27,000	Silver bullion, uncirculated

=== Grand Canyon (Arizona) ===
Grand Canyon reverse, 2010 (Nickel-clad copper unless otherwise noted)
Year	Mint	Mintage	Comments
2010	P	34,800,000	
2010	D	35,400,000	
2010	S	1,399,970	Proof
2010	S	859,435	Silver proof
2010	(P)	33,000	Silver bullion
2010	P	26,019	Silver bullion, uncirculated

=== Mount Hood (Oregon) ===
Mount Hood reverse, 2010 (Nickel-clad copper unless otherwise noted)
Year	Mint	Mintage	Comments
2010	P	34,400,000	
2010	D	34,400,000	
2010	S	1,397,101	Proof
2010	S	859,435	Silver proof
2010	(P)	33,000	Silver bullion
2010	P	26,019	Silver bullion, uncirculated

== 2011 quarters ==
=== Gettysburg (Pennsylvania) ===
Gettysburg reverse, 2011 (Nickel-clad copper unless otherwise noted)
Year	Mint	Mintage	Comments
2011	P	30,400,000	
2011	D	30,800,000	
2011	S	1,271,553	Proof
2011	S	722,076	Silver proof
2011	(P)	126,700	Silver bullion
2011	P	24,625	Silver bullion, uncirculated

=== Glacier (Montana) ===
Glacier reverse, 2011 (Nickel-clad copper unless otherwise noted)
Year	Mint	Mintage	Comments
2011	P	30,400,000	
2011	D	31,200,000	
2011	S	1,268,452	Proof
2011	S	722,076	Silver proof
2011	(P)	126,700	Silver bullion
2011	P	20,856	Silver bullion, uncirculated

=== Olympic (Washington) ===
Olympic reverse, 2011 (Nickel-clad copper unless otherwise noted)
Year	Mint	Mintage	Comments
2011	P	30,400,000	
2011	D	30,600,000	
2011	S	1,267,361	Proof
2011	S	722,076	Silver proof
2011	(P)	104,900	Silver bullion
2011	P	18,398	Silver bullion, uncirculated

=== Vicksburg (Mississippi) ===
Vicksburg reverse, 2011 (Nickel-clad copper unless otherwise noted)
Year	Mint	Mintage	Comments
2011	P	30,800,000	
2011	D	33,400,000	
2011	S	1,267,691	Proof
2011	S	722,076	Silver proof
2011	(P)	58,100	Silver bullion
2011	P	18,594	Silver bullion, uncirculated

=== Chickasaw (Oklahoma) ===
Chickasaw reverse, 2011 (Nickel-clad copper unless otherwise noted)
Year	Mint	Mintage	Comments
2011	P	73,800,000	
2011	D	69,400,000	
2011	S	1,266,010	Proof
2011	S	722,076	Silver proof
2011	(P)	48,700	Silver bullion
2011	P	16,827	Silver bullion, uncirculated

== 2012 quarters ==
=== El Yunque (Puerto Rico) ===
El Yunque reverse, 2012 (Nickel-clad copper unless otherwise noted)
Year	Mint	Mintage	Comments
2012	P	25,800,000	
2012	D	25,000,000	
2012	S	1,679,240	Uncirculated
2012	S	1,010,361	Proof
2012	S	557,891	Silver proof
2012	(P)	24,000	Silver bullion
2012	P	17,314	Silver bullion, uncirculated

=== Chaco Culture (New Mexico) ===
Chaco Culture reverse, 2012 (Nickel-clad copper unless otherwise noted)
Year	Mint	Mintage	Comments
2012	P	22,000,000	
2012	D	22,000,000	
2012	S	1,389,020	Uncirculated
2012	S	960,049	Proof
2012	S	557,891	Silver proof
2012	(P)	24,400	Silver bullion
2012	P	17,146	Silver bullion, uncirculated

=== Acadia (Maine) ===
Acadia reverse, 2012 (Nickel-clad copper unless otherwise noted)
Year	Mint	Mintage	Comments
2012	P	24,800,000	
2012	D	21,606,000	
2012	S	1,409,120	Uncirculated
2012	S	960,409	Proof
2012	S	557,891	Silver proof
2012	(P)	25,400	Silver bullion
2012	P	14,978	Silver bullion, uncirculated

=== Hawai'i Volcanoes (Hawaii) ===
Hawai'i Volcanoes reverse, 2012 (Nickel-clad copper unless otherwise noted)
Year	Mint	Mintage	Comments
2012	P	46,200,000	
2012	D	78,600,000	
2012	S	1,407,520	Uncirculated
2012	S	961,272	Proof
2012	S	557,891	Silver proof
2012	(P)	20,000	Silver bullion
2012	P	14,863	Silver bullion, uncirculated

=== Denali (Alaska) ===
Denali reverse, 2012 (Nickel-clad copper unless otherwise noted)
Year	Mint	Mintage	Comments
2012	P	135,400,000	
2012	D	166,600,000	
2012	S	1,401,920	Uncirculated
2012	S	957,856	Proof
2012	S	557,891	Silver proof
2012	(P)	20,000	Silver bullion
2012	P	15,225	Silver bullion, uncirculated

== 2013 quarters ==
=== White Mountain (New Hampshire) ===
White Mountain reverse, 2013 (Nickel-clad copper unless otherwise noted)
Year	Mint	Mintage	Comments
2013	P	68,800,000	
2013	D	107,600,000	
2013	S	1,606,900	Uncirculated
2013	S	950,080	Proof
2013	S	579,409	Silver proof
2013	(P)	35,000	Silver bullion
2013	P	20,530	Silver bullion, uncirculated

=== Perry's Victory (Ohio) ===
Perry's Victory reverse, 2013 (Nickel-clad copper unless otherwise noted)
Year	Mint	Mintage	Comments
2013	P	107,800,000	
2013	D	131,600,000	
2013	S	1,425,860	Uncirculated
2013	S	913,563	Proof
2013	S	579,409	Silver proof
2013	(P)	30,000	Silver bullion
2013	P	17,707	Silver bullion, uncirculated

=== Great Basin (Nevada) ===
Great Basin reverse, 2013 (Nickel-clad copper unless otherwise noted)
Year	Mint	Mintage	Comments
2013	P	122,400,000	
2013	D	141,400,000	
2013	S	1,316,580	Uncirculated
2013	S	911,525	Proof
2013	S	579,409	Silver proof
2013	(P)	30,000	Silver bullion
2013	P	17,792	Silver bullion, uncirculated

=== Fort McHenry (Maryland) ===
Fort McHenry reverse, 2013 (Nickel-clad copper unless otherwise noted)
Year	Mint	Mintage	Comments
2013	P	120,000,000	
2013	D	151,400,000	
2013	S	1,314,740	Uncirculated
2013	S	911,451	Proof
2013	S	579,409	Silver proof
2013	(P)	30,000	Silver bullion
2013	P	19,802	Silver bullion, uncirculated

=== Mount Rushmore (South Dakota) ===
Mount Rushmore reverse, 2013 (Nickel-clad copper unless otherwise noted)
Year	Mint	Mintage	Comments
2013	P	231,800,000	
2013	D	272,400,000	
2013	S	1,373,260	Uncirculated
2013	S	920,695	Proof
2013	S	579,409	Silver proof
2013	(P)	35,000	Silver bullion
2013	P	23,547	Silver bullion, uncirculated

== 2014 quarters ==
=== Great Smoky Mountains (Tennessee) ===
Great Smoky Mountains reverse, 2014 (Nickel-clad copper unless otherwise noted)
Year	Mint	Mintage	Comments
2014	P	73,200,000	
2014	D	99,400,000	
2014	S	1,360,780	Uncirculated
2014	S	828,186	Proof
2014	S	586,325	Silver proof
2014	(P)	33,000	Silver bullion
2014	P	24,710	Silver bullion, uncirculated

=== Shenandoah (Virginia) ===
Shenandoah reverse, 2014 (Nickel-clad copper unless otherwise noted)
Year	Mint	Mintage	Comments
2014	P	112,800,000	
2014	D	197,800,000	
2014	S	1,239,320	Uncirculated
2014	S	828,186	Proof
2014	S	586,325	Silver proof
2014	(P)	28,000	Silver bullion
2014	P	28,451	Silver bullion, uncirculated

=== Arches (Utah) ===
Arches reverse, 2014 (Nickel-clad copper unless otherwise noted)
Year	Mint	Mintage	Comments
2014	P	214,200,000	
2014	D	251,400,000	
2014	S	1,203,100	Uncirculated
2014	S	828,186	Proof
2014	S	586,325	Silver proof
2014	(P)	22,000	Silver bullion
2014	P	28,434	Silver bullion, uncirculated

=== Great Sand Dunes (Colorado) ===
Great Sand Dunes reverse, 2014 (Nickel-clad copper unless otherwise noted)
Year	Mint	Mintage	Comments
2014	P	159,600,000	
2014	D	171,800,000	
2014	S	1,146,000	Uncirculated
2014	S	828,186	Proof
2014	S	586,325	Silver proof
2014	(P)	22,000	Silver bullion
2014	P	24,103	Silver bullion, uncirculated

=== Everglades (Florida) ===
Everglades reverse, 2014 (Nickel-clad copper unless otherwise noted)
Year	Mint	Mintage	Comments
2014	P	157,601,200	
2014	D	142,400,000	
2014	S	1,139,140	Uncirculated
2014	S	828,186	Proof
2014	S	586,325	Silver proof
2014	(P)	34,000	Silver bullion
2014	P	22,732	Silver bullion, uncirculated

== 2015 quarters ==
=== Homestead (Nebraska) ===
Homestead reverse, 2015 (Nickel-clad copper unless otherwise noted)
Year	Mint	Mintage	Comments
2015	P	214,400,000	
2015	D	248,600,000	
2015	S	1,135,460	Uncirculated
2015	S	831,503	Proof
2015	S	443,630	Silver proof
2015	(P)	35,000	Silver bullion
2015	P	21,286	Silver bullion, uncirculated

=== Kisatchie (Louisiana) ===
Kisatchie reverse, 2015 (Nickel-clad copper unless otherwise noted)
Year	Mint	Mintage	Comments
2015	P	397,200,000	
2015	D	379,600,000	
2015	S	1,081,560	Uncirculated
2015	S	831,503	Proof
2015	S	443,630	Silver proof
2015	(P)	42,000	Silver bullion
2015	P	19,449	Silver bullion, uncirculated

=== Blue Ridge Parkway (North Carolina) ===
Blue Ridge Parkway reverse, 2015 (Nickel-clad copper unless otherwise noted)
Year	Mint	Mintage	Comments
2015	P	325,616,000	
2015	D	505,200,000	
2015	S	1,049,500	Uncirculated
2015	S	831,503	Proof
2015	S	443,630	Silver proof
2015	(P)	45,000	Silver bullion
2015	P	17,461	Silver bullion, uncirculated

=== Bombay Hook (Delaware) ===
Bombay Hook reverse, 2015 (Nickel-clad copper unless otherwise noted)
Year	Mint	Mintage	Comments
2015	P	275,000,000	
2015	D	206,400,000	
2015	S	923,960	Uncirculated
2015	S	831,503	Proof
2015	S	443,630	Silver proof
2015	(P)	45,000	Silver bullion
2015	P	17,309	Silver bullion, uncirculated

=== Saratoga (New York) ===
Saratoga reverse, 2015 (Nickel-clad copper unless otherwise noted)
Year	Mint	Mintage	Comments
2015	P	223,000,000	
2015	D	215,800,000	
2015	S	888,380	Uncirculated
2015	S	831,503	Proof
2015	S	443,630	Silver proof
2015	(P)	45,000	Silver bullion
2015	P	17,563	Silver bullion, uncirculated

== 2016 quarters ==
=== Shawnee (Illinois) ===
Shawnee reverse, 2016 (Nickel-clad copper unless otherwise noted)
Year	Mint	Mintage	Comments
2016	P	155,600,000	
2016	D	151,800,000	
2016	S	1,029,340	Uncirculated
2016	S	654,516	Proof
2016	S	474,207	Silver proof
2016	(P)	105,000	Silver bullion
2016	P	18,781	Silver bullion, uncirculated

=== Cumberland Gap (Kentucky) ===
Cumberland Gap reverse, 2016 (Nickel-clad copper unless otherwise noted)
Year	Mint	Mintage	Comments
2016	P	215,400,000	
2016	D	223,200,000	
2016	S	975,220	Uncirculated
2016	S	654,516	Proof
2016	S	474,207	Silver proof
2016	(P)	75,000	Silver bullion
2016	P	18,713	Silver bullion, uncirculated

=== Harpers Ferry (West Virginia) ===
Harpers Ferry reverse, 2016 (Nickel-clad copper unless otherwise noted)
Year	Mint	Mintage	Comments
2016	P	434,630,000	
2016	D	424,000,000	
2016	S	976,420	Uncirculated
2016	S	654,516	Proof
2016	S	474,207	Silver proof
2016	(P)	55,300	Silver bullion
2016	P	18,896	Silver bullion, uncirculated

=== Theodore Roosevelt (North Dakota) ===
Theodore Roosevelt reverse, 2016 (Nickel-clad copper unless otherwise noted)
Year	Mint	Mintage	Comments
2016	P	231,600,000	
2016	D	232,200,000	
2016	S	976,760	Uncirculated
2016	S	654,516	Proof
2016	S	474,207	Silver proof
2016	(P)	40,000	Silver bullion
2016	P	18,917	Silver bullion, uncirculated

=== Fort Moultrie (South Carolina) ===
Fort Moultrie reverse, 2016 (Nickel-clad copper unless otherwise noted)
Year	Mint	Mintage	Comments
2016	P	154,400,000	
2016	D	142,200,000	
2016	S	863,860	Uncirculated
2016	S	654,516	Proof
2016	S	474,207	Silver proof
2016	(P)	35,000	Silver bullion
2016	P	17,882	Silver bullion, uncirculated

== 2017 quarters ==
=== Effigy Mounds (Iowa) ===
Effigy Mounds reverse, 2017 (Nickel-clad copper unless otherwise noted)
Year	Mint	Mintage	Comments
2017	P	271,200,000	
2017	D	210,800,000	
2017	S	919,620	Uncirculated
2017	S	210,419	Enhanced uncirculated
2017	S	629,997	Proof
2017	S	466,711	Silver proof
2017	(P)	35,000	Silver bullion
2017	P	17,065	Silver bullion, uncirculated

=== Frederick Douglass (District of Columbia) ===
Frederick Douglass reverse, 2017 (Nickel-clad copper unless otherwise noted)
Year	Mint	Mintage	Comments
2017	P	184,800,000	
2017	D	185,800,000	
2017	S	910,760	Uncirculated
2017	S	210,419	Enhanced uncirculated
2017	S	629,997	Proof
2017	S	466,711	Silver proof
2017	(P)	20,000	Silver bullion
2017	P	17,678	Silver bullion, uncirculated

=== Ozark Riverways (Missouri) ===
Ozark Riverways reverse, 2017 (Nickel-clad copper unless otherwise noted)
Year	Mint	Mintage	Comments
2017	P	203,000,000	
2017	D	200,000,000	
2017	S	878,240	Uncirculated
2017	S	210,419	Enhanced uncirculated
2017	S	629,997	Proof
2017	S	466,711	Silver proof
2017	(P)	20,000	Silver bullion
2017	P	17,660	Silver bullion, uncirculated

=== Ellis Island (New Jersey) ===
Ellis Island reverse, 2017 (Nickel-clad copper unless otherwise noted)
Year	Mint	Mintage	Comments
2017	P	234,000,000	
2017	D	254,000,000	
2017	S	901,780	Uncirculated
2017	S	210,419	Enhanced uncirculated
2017	S	629,997	Proof
2017	S	466,711	Silver proof
2017	(P)	40,000	Silver bullion
2017	P	17,670	Silver bullion, uncirculated

=== George Rogers Clark (Indiana) ===
George Rogers Clark reverse, 2017 (Nickel-clad copper unless otherwise noted)
Year	Mint	Mintage	Comments
2017	P	196,600,000	
2017	D	180,800,000	
2017	S	815,540	Uncirculated
2017	S	210,419	Enhanced uncirculated
2017	S	629,997	Proof
2017	S	466,711	Silver proof
2017	(P)	35,000	Silver bullion
2017	P	14,731	Silver bullion, uncirculated

== 2018 quarters ==
=== Pictured Rocks (Michigan) ===
Pictured Rocks reverse, 2018 (Nickel-clad copper unless otherwise noted)
Year	Mint	Mintage	Comments
2018	P	186,714,000	
2018	D	182,600,000	
2018	S	946,617	Uncirculated
2018	S	637,779	Proof
2018	S	461,053	Silver proof
2018	S	199,177	Silver reverse proof
2018	(P)	30,000	Silver bullion
2018	P	17,598	Silver bullion, uncirculated

=== Apostle Islands (Wisconsin) ===
Apostle Islands reverse, 2018 (Nickel-clad copper unless otherwise noted)
Year	Mint	Mintage	Comments
2018	P	223,200,000	
2018	D	213,400,000	
2018	S	904,321	Uncirculated
2018	S	603,747	Proof
2018	S	461,053	Silver proof
2018	S	199,177	Silver reverse proof
2018	(P)	30,000	Silver bullion
2018	P	16,004	Silver bullion, uncirculated

=== Voyageurs (Minnesota) ===
Voyageurs reverse, 2018 (Nickel-clad copper unless otherwise noted)
Year	Mint	Mintage	Comments
2018	P	237,400,000	
2018	D	197,800,000	
2018	S	882,666	Uncirculated
2018	S	603,747	Proof
2018	S	461,053	Silver proof
2018	S	199,177	Silver reverse proof
2018	(P)	30,000	Silver bullion
2018	P	15,596	Silver bullion, uncirculated

=== Cumberland Island (Georgia) ===
Cumberland Island reverse, 2018 (Nickel-clad copper unless otherwise noted)
Year	Mint	Mintage	Comments
2018	P	138,000,000	
2018	D	151,600,000	
2018	S	896,361	Uncirculated
2018	S	603,747	Proof
2018	S	461,053	Silver proof
2018	S	199,177	Silver reverse proof
2018	(P)	52,500	Silver bullion
2018	P	14,153	Silver bullion, uncirculated

=== Block Island (Rhode Island) ===
Block Island reverse, 2018 (Nickel-clad copper unless otherwise noted)
Year	Mint	Mintage	Comments
2018	P	159,600,000	
2018	D	159,600,000	
2018	S	870,361	Uncirculated
2018	S	621,466	Proof
2018	S	461,053	Silver proof
2018	S	199,177	Silver reverse proof
2018	(P)	80,000	Silver bullion
2018	P	TBA	Silver bullion, uncirculated

== 2019 quarters ==
=== Lowell (Massachusetts) ===
Lowell reverse, 2019 (Nickel-clad copper unless otherwise noted)
Year	Mint	Mintage	Comments
2019	P	165,800,000	
2019	D	182,200,000	
2019	W	2,000,000	First time the "W" mint mark was used on a circulating coin.
2019	S	924,503	Uncirculated
2019	S	784,138	Proof
2019	S	541,220	Silver proof (First time the annual set is struck in 99.9% silver)
2019	(P)	TBA	Silver bullion
2019	P	TBA	Silver bullion, uncirculated

=== American Memorial Park (Northern Mariana Islands) ===
American Memorial Park reverse, 2019 (Nickel-clad copper unless otherwise noted)
Year	Mint	Mintage	Comments
2019	P	142,800,000	
2019	D	182,600,000	
2019	W	2,000,000	
2019	S	952,795	Uncirculated
2019	S	710,853	Proof
2019	S	541,220	Silver proof (First time the annual set is struck in 99.9% silver)
2019	(P)	TBA	Silver bullion
2019	P	TBA	Silver bullion, uncirculated

=== War In The Pacific (Guam) ===
War In The Pacific reverse, 2019 (Nickel-clad copper unless otherwise noted)
Year	Mint	Mintage	Comments
2019	P	116,600,000	
2019	D	114,400,000	
2019	W	2,000,000	
2019	S	945,719	Uncirculated
2019	S	710,853	Proof
2019	S	541,220	Silver proof (First time the annual set is struck in 99.9% silver)
2019	(P)	TBA	Silver bullion
2019	P	TBA	Silver bullion, uncirculated

=== San Antonio Missions (Texas) ===
San Antonio Missions reverse, 2019 (Nickel-clad copper unless otherwise noted)
Year	Mint	Mintage	Comments
2019	P	142,800,000	
2019	D	129,400,000	
2019	W	2,000,000	
2019	S	946,974	Uncirculated
2019	S	710,853	Proof
2019	S	541,220	Silver proof (First time the annual set is struck in 99.9% silver)
2019	(P)	TBA	Silver bullion
2019	P	TBA	Silver bullion, uncirculated

=== River Of No Return (Idaho) ===
River Of No Return reverse, 2019 (Nickel-clad copper unless otherwise noted)
Year	Mint	Mintage	Comments
2019	P	223,400,000	
2019	D	251,600,000	
2019	W	2,000,000	
2019	S	946,859	Uncirculated
2019	S	729,950	Proof
2019	S	541,220	Silver proof (First time the annual set is struck in 99.9% silver)
2019	(P)	TBA	Silver bullion
2019	P	TBA	Silver bullion, uncirculated

== 2020 quarters ==
=== National Park (American Samoa) ===
National Park reverse, 2020 (Nickel-clad copper unless otherwise noted)
Year	Mint	Mintage	Comments
2020	P	286,000,000	
2020	D	212,200,000	
2020	W	2,000,000	Obv. Privy mark “V75” inside Rainbow Pool added to 2020 only
2020	S	955,145	Uncirculated
2020	S	558,230	Proof
2020	S	427,256	Silver proof
2020	(P)	TBA	Silver bullion
2020	P	TBA	Silver bullion, uncirculated

=== Weir Farm (Connecticut) ===
Weir Farm reverse, 2020 (Nickel-clad copper unless otherwise noted)
Year	Mint	Mintage	Comments
2020	P	125,600,000	
2020	D	155,000,000	
2020	W	2,000,000	Obv. Privy mark “V75” inside Rainbow Pool added to 2020 only
2020	S	961,229	Uncirculated
2020	S	528,900	Proof
2020	S	427,256	Silver proof
2020	(P)	TBA	Silver bullion
2020	P	TBA	Silver bullion, uncirculated

=== Salt River Bay (U.S. Virgin Islands) ===
Salt River Bay reverse, 2020 (Nickel-clad copper unless otherwise noted)
Year	Mint	Mintage	Comments
2020	P	577,800,000	
2020	D	515,000,000	
2020	W	2,000,000	Obv. Privy mark “V75” inside Rainbow Pool added to 2020 only
2020	S	949,947	Uncirculated
2020	S	528,900	Proof
2020	S	427,256	Silver proof
2020	(P)	TBA	Silver bullion
2020	P	TBA	

=== Marsh-Billings-Rockefeller (Vermont) ===
Marsh-Billings-Rockefeller reverse, 2020 (Nickel-clad copper unless otherwise noted)
Year	Mint	Mintage	Comments
2020	P	304,600,000	
2020	D	345,800,000	
2020	W	2,000,000	Obv. Privy mark “V75” inside Rainbow Pool added to 2020 only
2020	S	945,449	Uncirculated
2020	S	528,900	Proof
2020	S	427,256	Silver proof
2020	(P)	TBA	Silver bullion
2020	P	TBA	Silver bullion, uncirculated

=== Tallgrass Prairie (Kansas) ===
Tallgrass Prairie reverse, 2020 (Nickel-clad copper unless otherwise noted)
Year	Mint	Mintage	Comments
2020	P	101,200,000	
2020	D	142,400,000	
2020	W	2,000,000	Obv. Privy mark “V75” inside Rainbow Pool added to 2020 only
2020	S	951,612	Uncirculated
2020	S	545,638	Proof
2020	S	427,256	Silver proof
2020	(P)	TBA	Silver bullion
2020	P	TBA	Silver bullion, uncirculated

== 2021 quarters ==
=== Tuskegee Airmen (Alabama) ===
Tuskegee Airmen reverse, 2021 (Nickel-clad copper unless otherwise noted)
Year	Mint	Mintage	Comments
2021	P	160,400,000	
2021	D	304,000,000	
2021	S	858,572	Uncirculated
2021	S	559,571	Proof
2021	S	350,891	Silver proof
2021	(P)	TBA	Silver bullion
2021	P	TBA	Silver bullion, uncirculated

*According to last published US Mint cumulative sales figures. LKS (Last Known Sale) figures are pending.

== See also ==
- United States cent mintage figures
  - Lincoln cent mintage figures
- United States nickel mintage figures
- Roosevelt dime mintage figures
- United States quarter mintage figures
  - Washington quarter mintage figures
  - 50 State quarter mintage figures
  - American Women quarters
- United States half dollar mintage figures
  - Kennedy half dollar mintage figures
- American Silver Eagle mintage figures
