= United States half dollar mintage figures =

Mintage figures of the United States half dollar up to 1963

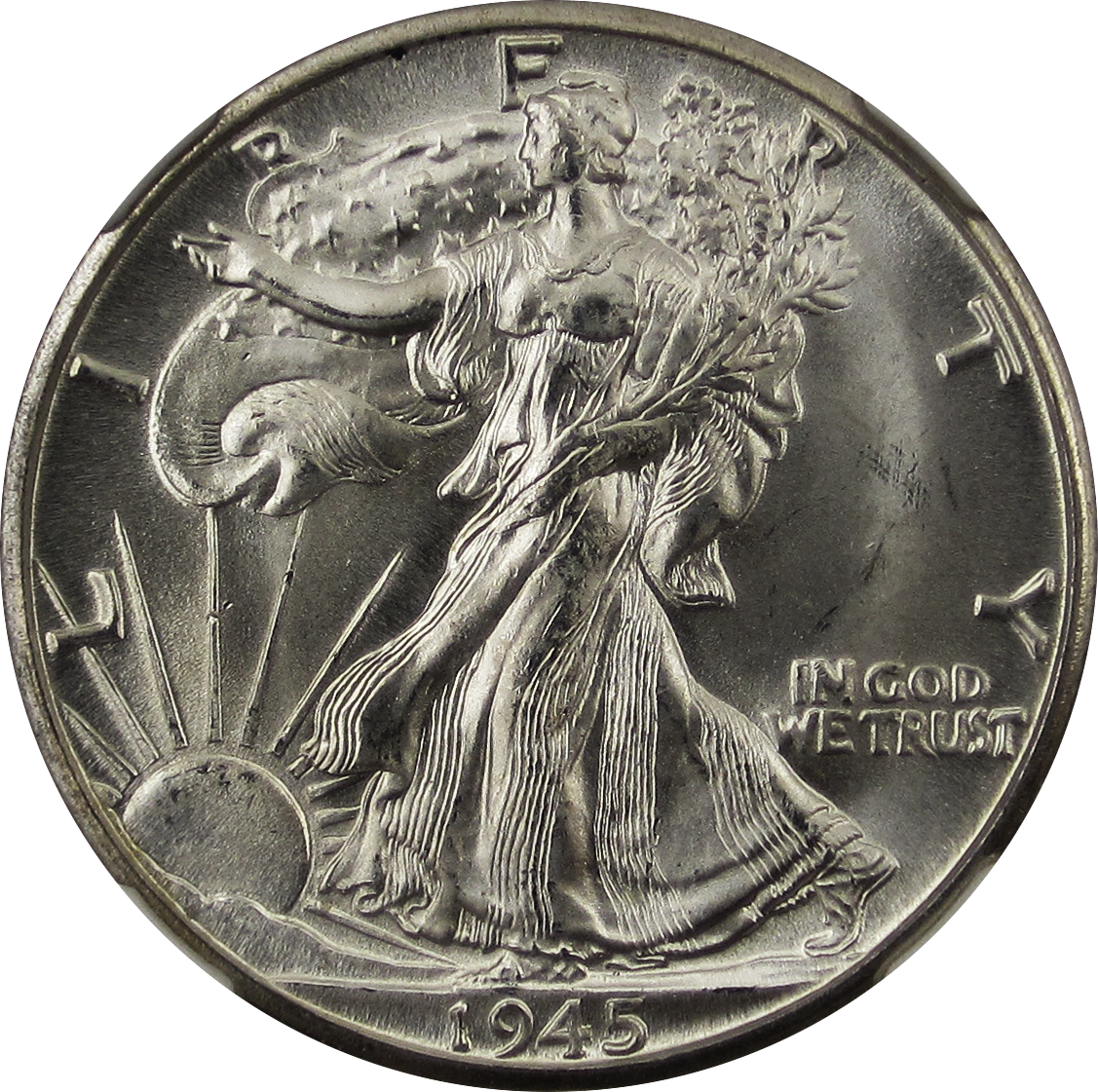
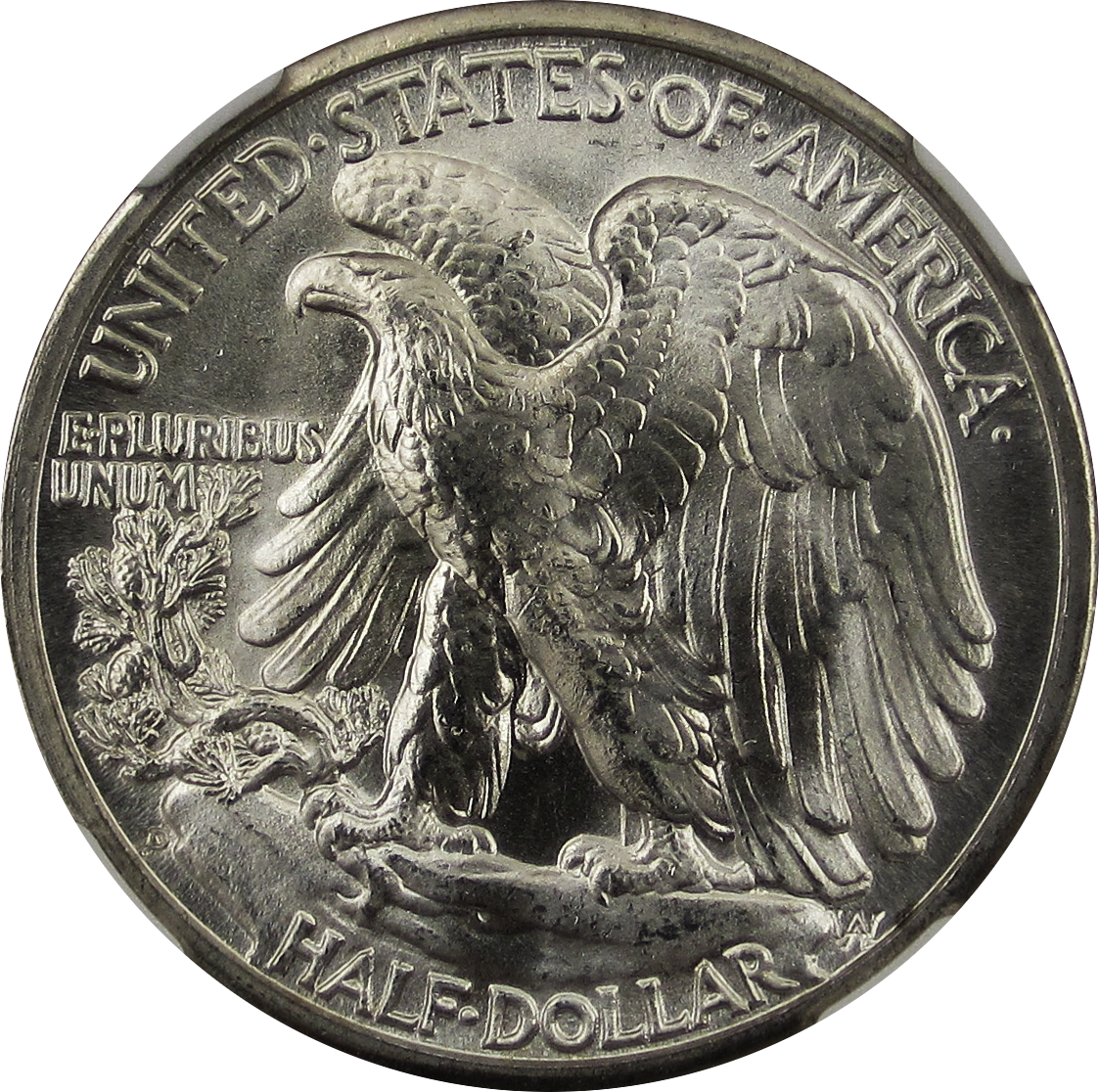
Walking Liberty half dollar

Below are the mintage figures for the United States half dollar up to 1963, before the Kennedy half dollar design was introduced. For those, see:

The following mint marks indicate which mint the coin was made at (parentheses indicate a lack of a mint mark):

P = Philadelphia Mint

D = Denver Mint

S = San Francisco Mint

W = West Point Mint

O = New Orleans Mint

CC = Carson City Mint

== Flowing Hair half dollar ==
Small eagle reverse, 1796 (Silver)
Year	Mint	Mintage	Comments
1794	(P)	23,464	
1795	(P)	299,680	

== Draped Bust half dollars ==
=== Small eagle reverse ===
Small eagle reverse, 1796-1797 (Silver)
Year	Mint	Mintage	Comments
1796	(P)	3,918	There are 15- and 16-star varieties.
1797	(P)	(unknown)	

=== Heraldic eagle reverse ===
Heraldic eagle reverse, 1801–1807 (Silver)
Year	Mint	Mintage	Comments
1801	(P)	30,289	
1802	(P)	29,890	
1803	(P)	188,234	
1804	n/a	0	None struck.
1805	(P)	211,722	
1806	(P)	839,576	Varieties include knobbed/pointed 6, 6 over 5, large/small stars, stem through/not through claw, and E over A in "States".
1807	(P)	301,076	

== Capped Bust half dollar ==
=== Lettered Edge ===
Lettered Edge, 1807–1836 (Silver)
Year	Mint	Mintage	Comments
1807	(P)	750,500	Small/large stars, 50 over 20, and Bearded Liberty varieties.
1808	(P)	1,368,600	
1809	(P)	1,405,810	
1810	(P)	1,276,276	
1811	(P)	1,203,644	
1812	(P)	1,628,059	
1813	(P)	1,241,903	
1814	(P)	1,039,075	
1815	(P)	47,150	5 over 2.
1816	n/a	0	None struck.
1817	(P)	1,215,564	
1818	(P)	1,960,322	
1819	(P)	2,208,000	
1820	(P)	751,122	Varieties include 20 over 19, square/curl base 2, large/small date.
1821	(P)	1,305,797	
1822	(P)	1,559,573	
1823	(P)	1,694,200	
1824	(P)	3,504,954	
1825	(P)	2,943,166	
1826	(P)	4,004,180	
1827	(P)	5,493,400	
1828	(P)	3,075,200	Curled/square base 2, large/small letters, large/small 8s.
1829	(P)	3,712,156	
1830	(P)	4,764,800	
1831	(P)	5,873,660	
1832	(P)	4,797,000	
1833	(P)	5,206,000	
1834	(P)	6,412,004	
1835	(P)	5,352,006	
1836	(P)	6,545,000	

=== Reeded Edge ===
==== "50 Cents" on Reverse ====
Reeded Edge "50 Cents", 1836–1837 (Silver)
Year	Mint	Mintage	Comments
1836	(P)	1,200	
1837	(P)	3,629,820	

==== "Half Dol." on Reverse ====
Reeded Edge "Half Dol.", 1838–1839 (Silver)
Year	Mint	Mintage	Comments
1838	(P)	3,546,000	
1838	O	20	First year New Orleans produced the half dollar.
1839	(P)	1,392,976	
1839	O	116,000	

== Seated Liberty half dollar ==
=== No motto ===
No motto, arrows, or rays, 1839–1853 (Silver)
Year	Mint	Mintage	Comments
1839	(P)	100,000	No drapery from elbow.
1839	(P)	1,972,400	Drapery from elbow.
1840	(P)	1,435,008	
1840	O	855,100	
1841	(P)	310,000	
1841	O	401,000	
1842	(P)	2,012,764	
1842	O	203,000	Small date, small letters variety.
1842	O	754,000	Medium date, large letters variety.
1843	(P)	3,844,000	
1843	O	2,268,000	
1844	(P)	1,766,000	
1844	O	2,005,000	
1845	(P)	589,000	
1845	O	2,094,000	
1846	(P)	2,210,000	
1846	O	2,304,000	Medium and tall dates.
1847	(P)	1,156,000	
1847	O	2,584,000	
1848	(P)	580,000	
1848	O	3,180,000	
1849	(P)	1,252,000	
1849	O	2,310,000	
1850	(P)	227,000	
1850	O	2,456,000	
1851	(P)	200,750	
1851	O	402,000	
1852	(P)	77,130	
1852	O	144,000	
1853	O	4	No arrows, no rays. Only four known to exist.

=== Arrows and rays, no motto ===
Arrows and rays, no motto, 1853 (Silver)
Year	Mint	Mintage	Comments
1853	(P)	3,532,708	Arrows at date; rays on reverse.
1853	O	1,328,000	Arrows at date; rays on reverse.

=== Arrows, no rays or motto ===
Arrows, no rays or motto, 1854–1855 (Silver)
Year	Mint	Mintage	Comments
1854	(P)	2,982,000	
1854	O	5,240,000	
1855	(P)	759,500	
1855	O	2,688,000	
1855	S	129,950	First year San Francisco produced the half dollar.

=== No motto, arrows, or rays ===
No motto, arrows, or rays, 1856–1866 (Silver)
Year	Mint	Mintage	Comments
1856	(P)	938,000	
1856	O	2,658,000	
1856	S	211,000	
1857	(P)	1,988,000	
1857	O	818,000	
1857	S	158,000	
1858	(P)	4,226,000	
1858	O	7,294,000	
1858	S	476,000	
1859	(P)	747,200	
1859	O	2,834,000	
1859	S	566,000	
1860	(P)	302,700	
1860	O	1,290,000	
1860	S	472,000	
1861	(P)	2,888,400	
1861	O	2,532,633	
1861	S	939,500	
1862	(P)	253,550	
1862	S	1,352,000	
1863	(P)	503,660	
1863	S	916,000	
1864	(P)	379,570	
1864	S	658,000	
1865	(P)	511,900	
1865	S	675,000	
1866	S	60,000	

=== Motto, no arrows ===
Motto above eagle, no arrows, 1866–1873 (Silver)
Year	Mint	Mintage	Comments
1866	(P)	745,625	
1866	S	994,000	
1867	(P)	449,925	
1867	S	1,196,000	
1868	(P)	418,200	
1868	S	1,160,000	
1869	(P)	795,900	
1869	S	656,000	
1870	(P)	634,900	
1870	S	1,004,000	
1870	CC	54,617	First year Carson City produced the half dollar.
1871	(P)	1,204,560	
1871	S	2,178,000	
1871	CC	153,950	
1872	(P)	881,550	
1872	S	580,000	
1872	CC	257,000	
1873	(P)	587,000	Closed 3.
1873	(P)	214,200	Open 3.
1873	S	5,000	None are known to currently exist; they were most likely melted down.
1873	CC	122,500	

=== Motto and arrows ===
Motto and arrows at date, 1873–1874 (Silver)
Year	Mint	Mintage	Comments
1873	(P)	1,815,700	
1873	S	228,000	
1873	CC	214,560	
1874	(P)	2,360,300	
1874	S	394,000	
1874	CC	59,000	

=== Motto, no arrows ===
Motto above eagle, no arrows, 1875–1891 (Silver)
Year	Mint	Mintage	Comments
1875	(P)	6,027,500	
1875	S	3,200,000	
1875	CC	1,008,000	
1876	(P)	8,419,150	
1876	S	4,528,000	
1876	CC	1,956,000	
1877	(P)	8,304,510	
1877	S	5,356,000	
1877	CC	1,420,000	
1878	(P)	1,378,400	
1878	S	12,000	
1878	CC	62,000	
1879	(P)	4,800 or 5,900	
1880	(P)	8,400 or 9,755	
1881	(P)	10,000 or 10,975	
1882	(P)	4,400 or 5,500	
1883	(P)	8,000 or 9,039	
1884	(P)	4,400 or 5,275	
1885	(P)	5,200 or 6,130	
1886	(P)	5,000 or 5,886	
1887	(P)	5,000 or 5,710	
1888	(P)	12,000 or 12,833	
1889	(P)	12,000 or 12,711	
1890	(P)	12,000 or 12,590	
1891	(P)	200,000 or 200,600	

== Barber half dollar ==
Barber half dollar, 1892–1915 (Silver)
Year	Mint	Mintage	Comments
1892	(P)	935,245	
1892	O	390,000	Includes Micro-O variety.
1892	S	1,029,028	
1893	(P)	1,826,792	
1893	O	1,389,000	
1893	S	740,000	
1894	(P)	1,148,972	
1894	O	2,138,000	
1894	S	4,048,690	
1895	(P)	1,835,218	
1895	O	1,766,000	
1895	S	1,108,086	
1896	(P)	950,762	
1896	O	924,000	
1896	S	1,140,948	
1897	(P)	2,480,731	
1897	O	632,000	
1897	S	933,900	
1898	(P)	2,945,735	
1898	O	874,000	
1898	S	2,358,550	
1899	(P)	5,538,846	
1899	O	1,724,000	
1899	S	1,686,411	
1900	(P)	4,762,912	
1900	O	2,744,000	
1900	S	2,560,322	
1901	(P)	4,268,813	
1901	O	1,124,000	
1901	S	847,044	
1902	(P)	4,922,777	
1902	O	2,526,000	
1902	S	1,460,670	
1903	(P)	2,278,755	
1903	O	2,100,000	
1903	S	1,920,772	
1904	(P)	2,992,670	
1904	O	1,117,600	
1904	S	553,038	
1905	(P)	662,727	
1905	O	505,000	
1905	S	2,494,000	
1906	(P)	2,638,675	
1906	O	2,446,000	
1906	S	1,740,154	
1906	D	4,028,000	First year Denver produced the half dollar.
1907	(P)	2,598,575	
1907	O	3,946,000	
1907	S	1,250,000	
1907	D	3,856,000	
1908	(P)	1,354,545	
1908	O	5,360,000	
1908	S	1,644,828	
1908	D	3,280,000	
1909	(P)	2,368,650	
1909	O	925,400	Final year New Orleans produced the half dollar.
1909	S	1,764,000	
1910	(P)	418,551	
1910	S	1,948,000	
1911	(P)	1,406,543	
1911	S	1,272,000	
1911	D	695,080	
1912	(P)	1,550,700	
1912	S	1,370,000	
1912	D	2,300,800	
1913	(P)	188,624	
1913	S	604,000	
1913	D	534,000	
1914	(P)	124,610	
1914	S	992,000	
1915	(P)	138,450	
1915	S	1,604,000	
1915	D	1,170,400	

== Walking Liberty half dollar ==
=== Type 1 ===
Mint mark on obverse, 1916–1917 (Silver)
Year	Mint	Mintage	Comments
1916	(P)	608,000	
1916	S	508,000	
1916	D	1,014,400	
1917	(P)	0	Philadelphia half dollars do not show a mint mark; for mintage, see Type 2 immediately below.
1917	S	952,000	
1917	D	765,400	

=== Type 2 ===
Mint mark on reverse, 1917–1947 (Silver)
Year	Mint	Mintage	Comments
1917	(P)	12,292,000	
1917	S	5,554,000	
1917	D	1,940,000	
1918	(P)	6,634,000	
1918	S	10,282,000	
1918	D	3,853,040	
1919	(P)	962,000	
1919	S	1,552,000	
1919	D	1,165,000	
1920	(P)	6,372,000	
1920	S	4,624,000	
1920	D	1,551,000	
1921	(P)	246,000	
1921	S	548,000	
1921	D	208,000	
1923	S	2,178,000	
1927	S	2,392,000	
1928	S	1,940,000	
1929	S	1,902,000	
1929	D	1,001,200	
1933	S	1,786,000	
1934	(P)	6,964,000	
1934	S	3,652,000	
1934	D	2,361,400	
1935	(P)	9,162,000	
1935	S	3,854,000	
1935	D	3,003,800	
1936	(P)	12,617,901	
1936	S	3,884,000	
1936	D	4,252,400	
1937	(P)	9,527,728	
1937	S	2,090,000	
1937	D	1,676,000	
1938	(P)	4,118,152	
1938	D	491,600	
1939	(P)	6,820,808	
1939	S	2,552,000	
1939	D	4,267,800	
1940	(P)	9,167,279	
1940	S	4,550,000	
1941	(P)	24,207,412	
1941	S	8,098,000	
1941	D	11,248,400	
1942	(P)	47,839,120	
1942	S	12,708,000	
1942	D	10,973,800	
1943	(P)	53,190,000	
1943	S	13,450,000	
1943	D	11,346,000	
1944	(P)	28,206,000	
1944	S	8,904,000	
1944	D	9,769,000	
1945	(P)	31,502,000	
1945	S	10,156,000	
1945	D	9,966,800	
1946	(P)	12,118,000	
1946	S	3,724,000	
1946	D	2,151,000	
1947	(P)	4,094,000	
1947	D	3,900,600	

== Franklin half dollars ==
Franklin half dollars, 1948-1963 (Silver)
Year	Mint	Mintage	Comments
1948	(P)	3,006,814	
1948	D	4,028,600	
1949	(P)	5,614,000	
1949	S	3,744,000	
1949	D	4,120,600	
1950	(P)	7,793,509	
1950	D	8,031,600	
1951	(P)	16,859,602	
1951	S	13,696,000	
1951	D	9,475,200	
1952	(P)	21,274,073	
1952	S	5,526,000	
1952	D	25,395,600	
1953	(P)	2,796,920	
1953	S	4,148,000	
1953	D	20,900,400	
1954	(P)	13,421,503	
1954	S	4,993,400	
1954	D	25,445,580	
1955	(P)	2,876,381	
1956	(P)	4,701,384	
1957	(P)	6,361,952	
1957	D	19,966,850	
1958	(P)	4,917,652	
1958	D	23,962,412	
1959	(P)	7,349,291	
1959	D	13,053,750	
1960	(P)	7,715,602	
1960	D	18,215,812	
1961	(P)	11,318,244	Includes doubled-die reverse.
1961	D	20,276,442	
1962	(P)	12,932,019	
1962	D	35,473,281	
1963	(P)	25,239,645	
1963	D	67,069,292	

== See also ==
- United States cent mintage figures
  - Lincoln cent mintage figures
- United States nickel mintage figures
- Roosevelt dime mintage figures
- United States quarter mintage figures
  - Washington quarter mintage figures
  - 50 State quarter mintage figures
  - America the Beautiful quarter mintage figures
  - American Women quarters
  - Kennedy half dollar mintage figures
- American Silver Eagle mintage figures
