= Roosevelt dime mintage figures =

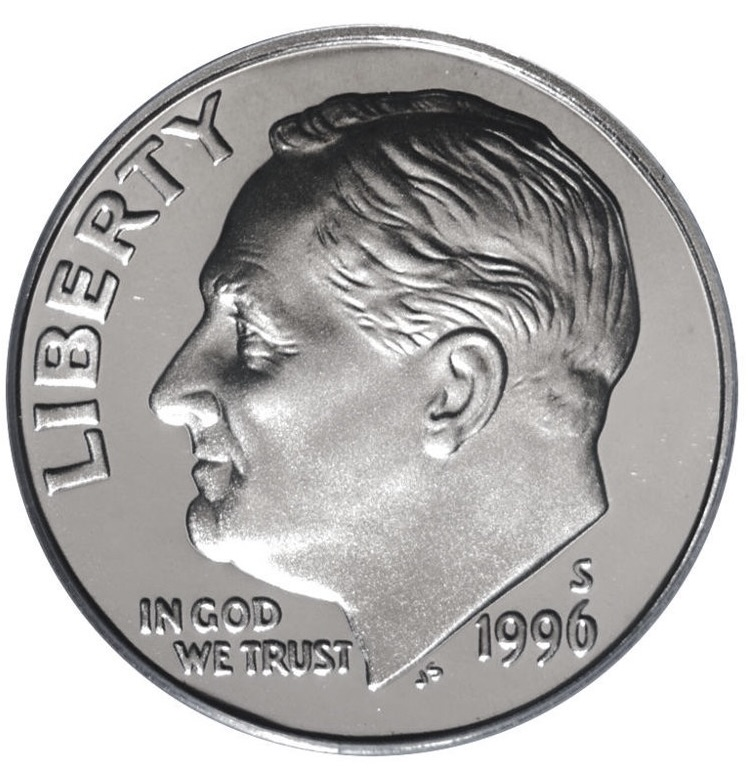
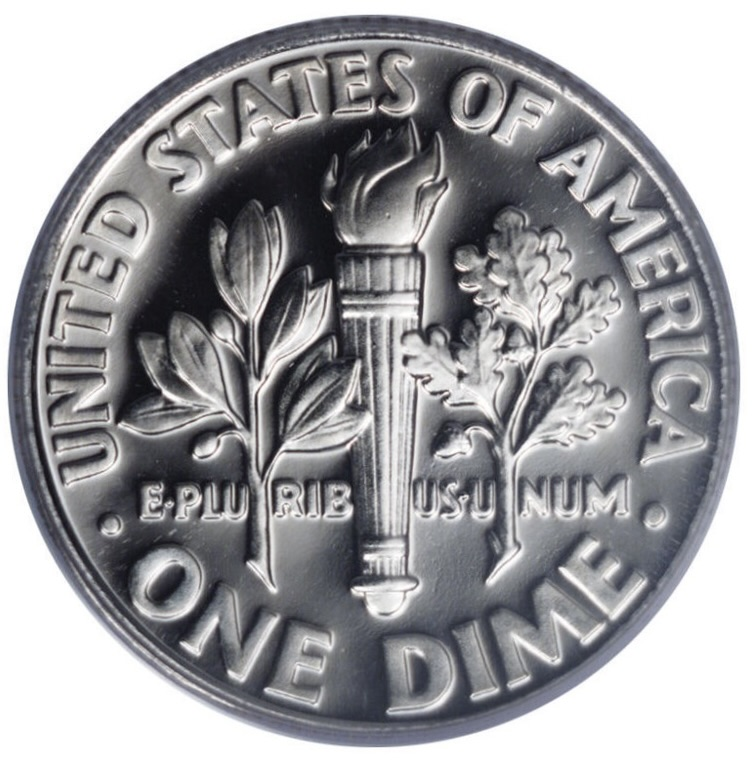
Roosevelt dime

Below are the mintage figures for the Roosevelt dime.

The following mint marks indicate which mint the coin was made at (parentheses indicate a lack of a mint mark):

P = Philadelphia Mint

D = Denver Mint

S = San Francisco Mint

W = West Point Mint

== Silver dimes ==
Initial Composition (90% silver, 10% copper) 1946–1964
Year	Mint	Mintage	Comments
1946	P	255,250,000	
1946	D	61,043,500	
1946	S	27,900,000	
1947	P	121,520,000	
1947	D	46,835,000	
1947	S	34,840,000	
1948	P	74,950,000	
1948	D	52,841,000	
1948	S	35,520,000	
1949	P	30,940,000	
1949	D	26,034,000	
1949	S	13,510,000	
1950	P	50,130,114	
1950	D	46,803,000	
1950	S	20,440,000	
1951	P	103,880,102	
1951	D	56,529,000	
1951	S	31,630,000	
1952	P	99,040,093	
1952	D	122,100,000	
1952	S	44,419,500	
1953	P	53,490,120	
1953	D	136,433,000	
1953	S	39,180,000	
1954	P	114,010,200	
1954	D	106,397,000	
1954	S	22,860,000	
1955	P	12,450,181	
1955	D	13,959,000	
1955	S	18,510,000	
1956	P	108,640,000	
1956	D	108,015,100	
1957	P	160,160,000	
1957	D	113,354,330	
1958	P	31,910,000	
1958	D	136,564,600	
1959	P	85,780,000	
1959	D	164,919,790	
1960	P	70,390,000	
1960	D	200,160,400	
1961	P	93,730,000	
1961	D	209,146,550	
1962	P	72,450,000	
1962	D	334,948,380	
1963	P	123,650,000	
1963	D	421,476,530	
1964	P	929,360,000	
1964	D	1,357,517,180	

== Clad dimes ==
Copper-Nickel Clad Composition (75% copper, 25% nickel) 1965–2025
Year	Mint	Mintage	Comments
1965	(P & D)	1,652,140,570	
1966	(P & D)	1,382,734,540	
1967	(P & D)	2,244,007,320	
1968	(P)	424,470,400	
1968	D	480,748,280	
1969	(P)	145,790,000	
1969	D	563,323,870	
1970	(P)	345,570,000	
1970	D	754,942,100	
1971	(P)	162,690,000	
1971	D	377,914,240	
1972	(P)	431,540,000	
1972	D	330,290,000	
1973	(P)	315,670,000	
1973	D	455,032,426	
1974	(P)	470,248,000	
1974	D	571,083,000	
1975	(P)	585,673,900	
1975	D	313,705,300	
1976	(P)	568,760,000	
1976	D	695,222,774	
1977	(P)	796,930,000	
1977	D	376,607,228	
1978	(P)	663,980,000	
1978	D	282,847,540	
1979	(P)	315,440,000	
1979	D	390,921,184	
1980	P	735,170,000	
1980	D	719,354,321	
1981	P	676,650,000	
1981	D	712,284,143	
1982	P	519,475,000	
1982	D	542,713,584	
1982	(P)	(150,000)	
1983	P	647,025,000	
1983	D	730,129,224	
1984	P	856,669,000	
1984	D	704,803,976	
1985	P	705,200,962	
1985	D	587,979,970	
1986	P	682,649,693	
1986	D	473,326,970	
1987	P	762,709,481	
1987	D	653,203,402	
1988	P	1,030,550,000	
1988	D	962,385,489	
1989	P	1,298,400,000	
1989	D	896,535,597	
1990	P	1,034,340,000	
1990	D	839,995,824	
1991	P	927,220,000	
1991	D	601,241,114	
1992	P	593,500,000	
1992	D	616,273,932	
1993	P	766,180,000	
1993	D	750,110,166	
1994	P	1,189,000,000	
1994	D	1,303,268,110	
1995	P	1,125,500,000	
1995	D	1,274,890,000	
1996	P	1,421,163,000	
1996	D	1,400,300,000	
1996	W	1,457,000	
1997	P	991,640,000	
1997	D	979,810,000	
1998	P	1,163,000,000	
1998	D	1,172,250,000	
1999	P	2,164,000,000	
1999	D	1,397,750,000	
2000	P	1,842,500,000	
2000	D	1,818,700,000	
2001	P	1,369,590,000	
2001	D	1,412,800,000	
2002	P	1,187,500,000	
2002	D	1,379,500,000	
2003	P	1,085,500,000	
2003	D	986,500,000	
2004	P	1,328,000,000	
2004	D	1,159,500,000	
2005	P	1,412,000,000	
2005	D	1,423,500,000	
2005	P (Satin)	1,160,000	
2005	D (Satin)	1,160,000	
2006	P	1,381,000,000	
2006	D	1,447,000,000	
2006	P (Satin)	847,361	
2006	D (Satin)	847,361	
2007	P	391,000,000	
2007	D	624,500,000	
2007	P (Satin)	895,628	
2007	D (Satin)	895,628	
2008	P	413,000,000	
2008	D	637,500,000	
2008	P (Satin)	745,464	
2008	D (Satin)	745,464	
2009	P	96,500,000	
2009	D	49,500,000	
2009	P (Satin)	784,614	
2009	D (Satin)	784,614	
2010	P	557,000,000	
2010	D	562,000,000	
2010	P (Satin)	583,897	
2010	D (Satin)	583,897	
2011	P	748,000,000	
2011	D	754,000,000	
2012	P	808,000,000	
2012	D	868,000,000	
2013	P	1,086,500,000	
2013	D	1,025,000,000	
2014	P	1,125,000,000	
2014	D	1,177,000,000	
2015	P	1,497,510,000	
2015	D	1,543,500,000	
2016	P	1,517,000,000	
2016	D	1,437,000,000	
2017	P	1,437,500,000	
2017	D	1,290,500,000	
2017	S (Enhanced)	223,310	
2018	P	1,193,000,000	
2018	D	1,006,000,000	
2019	P	1,147,500,000	
2019	D	1,001,500,000	
2020	P	1,333,500,000	
2020	D	1,445,000,000	
2021	P	1,349,250,000	
2021	D	1,481,000,000	
2022	P	1,551,000,000	
2022	D	1,583,000,000	
2023	P	1,410,500,000	
2023	D	1,295,000,000	
2024	P	307,000,000	
2024	D	248,000,000	
2025	P	520,000,000	
2025	D	427,400,000	

== See also ==
- United States cent mintage figures
  - Lincoln cent mintage figures
- United States nickel mintage figures
- United States quarter mintage figures
  - Washington quarter mintage figures
  - 50 State quarters
  - America the Beautiful quarter mintage figures
  - American Women quarters
- United States half dollar mintage figures
  - Kennedy half dollar mintage figures
- American Silver Eagle mintage figures
