= United States nickel mintage figures =

These are the mintage quantities for strikings of the United States nickel.

P = Philadelphia Mint
D = Denver Mint
S = San Francisco Mint
W = West Point Mint

Parenthesis around the mint mark denotes that the coin does not have a mint mark on the coin, but was minted in that location.

== Designs ==
=== Shield nickels (1866–1883) ===
With Rays, 1866–1867
Year	Mint	Mintage	Comments
1866	(P)	14,742,500	First year of issue
1867	(P)	2,019,000	Second and last year with rays on reverse of coin. Most 1867 shield nickels are of the "No Rays" variety.

Without Rays, 1867–1883
Year	Mint	Mintage	Comments
1867	(P)	28,890,500	Type 2, Without Rays
1868	(P)	28,817,000	
1869	(P)	16,395,000	
1870	(P)	4,806,000	
1871	(P)	561,000	
1872	(P)	6,036,000	
1873	(P)	4,549,100	Includes Open 3 and Closed 3 varieties
1874	(P)	3,538,000	
1875	(P)	2,097,000	
1876	(P)	2,530,000	
1877	(P)	900	Proof only
1878	(P)	2,350	Proof only
1879	(P)	29,100	
1880	(P)	19,995	Key date
1881	(P)	72,375	
1882	(P)	11,476,600	
1883	(P)	1,456,919	Last year of issue

=== Liberty Head V nickel (1883–1913) ===
Liberty Head V Nickel (1883-1913)
Year	Mint	Mintage	Comments
1883	(P)	5,479,519	1883, No "CENTS" on reverse
1883	(P)	16,032,983	1883, With "CENTS" on reverse
1884	(P)	11,273,942	
1885	(P)	1,476,490	Key date
1886	(P)	3,330,290	Key date
1887	(P)	15,263,652	
1888	(P)	10,720,483	
1889	(P)	15,881,361	
1890	(P)	16,259,272	
1891	(P)	16,834,350	
1892	(P)	11,699,642	
1893	(P)	13,370,195	
1894	(P)	5,413,132	
1895	(P)	9,979,884	
1896	(P)	8,842,920	
1897	(P)	20,428,735	
1898	(P)	12,532,087	
1899	(P)	26,029,031	
1900	(P)	27,255,995	
1901	(P)	26,480,213	
1902	(P)	31,480,579	
1903	(P)	28,006,725	
1904	(P)	21,404,984	
1905	(P)	29,827,276	
1906	(P)	38,613,725	
1907	(P)	39,214,800	
1908	(P)	22,686,177	
1909	(P)	11,590,526	
1910	(P)	30,169,353	
1911	(P)	39,559,372	Highest mintage of the series
1912	(P)	26,236,714	
1912	D	8,474,000	Only year minted at the Denver Mint
1912	S	238,000	Only year minted at the San Francisco Mint, Key date
1913	(P)	5	Incredibly rare, 5 known to exist

=== Indian Head (or Buffalo) nickel (1913–1938) ===
Indian Head (or Buffalo) nickel 1913–1938
Year	Mint	Mintage	Comments
1913, Type 1	(P)	30,993,520	Type 1, mound on reverse
1913, Type 1	D	5,337,000	Type 1, mound on reverse
1913, Type 1	S	2,105,000	Type 1, mound on reverse
1913, Type 2	(P)	29,858,700	Type 2, flat on reverse
1913, Type 2	D	4,156,000	Type 2, flat on reverse
1913, Type 2	S	1,209,000	Type 2, flat on reverse, Key date
1914	(P)	20,665,738	Includes 4 Over 3 variety
1914	D	3,912,000	Semi-key date
1914	S	3,470,000	
1915	(P)	20,987,270	
1915	D	7,569,500	
1915	S	1,505,000	Semi-key date
1916	(P)	63,498,066	
1916	D	13,333,000	
1916	S	11,860,000	
1917	(P)	51,424,029	
1917	D	9,910,800	
1917	S	4,193,000	
1918	(P)	32,086,314	
1918	D	8,362,314	Includes 8 Over 7 variety
1918	S	4,882,000	
1919	(P)	60,868,000	
1919	D	8,006,000	
1919	S	7,521,000	
1920	(P)	63,093,000	
1920	D	9,418,000	
1920	S	9,689,000	
1921	(P)	10,663,000	
1921	S	1,557,000	Semi-key date
1923	(P)	35,715,000	No buffalo nickels were made in 1922. Production resumed in 1923
1923	S	6,142,000	Semi-key date
1924	(P)	21,620,000	
1924	D	5,258,000	
1924	S	1,437,000	Semi-key date
1925	(P)	35,565,100	
1925	D	4,450,000	
1925	S	6,256,000	
1926	(P)	44,693,000	
1926	D	5,638,000	
1926	S	970,000	Semi-key date
1927	(P)	37,981,000	
1927	D	5,730,000	
1927	S	3,430,000	
1928	(P)	23,411,000	
1928	D	6,436,000	
1928	S	6,936,000	
1929	(P)	36,446,000	
1929	D	8,370,000	
1929	S	7,754,000	
1930	(P)	22,849,000	
1930	S	5,435,000	
1931	S	1,200,000	Only S mintmarks for 1931. Semi-key date
1934	(P)	20,213,003	No nickels minted during 1932 and 1933. Production resumes 1934
1934	D	7,480,000	
1935	(P)	58,264,000	
1935	D	12,092,000	
1935	S	10,300,000	
1936	(P)	119,001,420	Highest mintage of the series
1936	D	24,814,000	Includes the rare "3 and 1/2 Legs" variety
1936	S	14,930,000	
1937	(P)	79,485,769	Second-highest mintage of the series
1937	D	17,826,000	Includes the rare "3 Legs" variety
1937	S	5,635,000	
1938	D	7,020,000	Includes the "D on S" variety, 1938 Buffalo nickels were only minted in Denver

=== Jefferson nickels (1938–present) ===
Jefferson nickels have been minted since 1938 at the Philadelphia and Denver mints and from the San Francisco mint until 1970. Key dates for the series include the 1939-D, and 1950-D nickels. The 1939-D nickel with a mintage of 3,514,000 coins is the second lowest behind the 1950-D nickel. The cause of the key date of 1939 stems from the new design that excited collectors the year prior, after the initial hype had settled down fewer nickels were saved. 2,630,000 nickels were minted in Denver in 1950, this remains the lowest mintage for the Denver mint in the series. Despite its low mintage the nickel is not rare, its value is thought to be connected to the brilliant uncirculated roll boom that burst between 1963 and 1964. On the opposite spectrum, the year 1964 saw the largest combined mintage of nickels to date. The result of the large mintages were due to a widespread shortage of small change that was blamed on coin collectors. the following year, The Coinage Act of 1965 removed all mint marks from nickels that were issued by the mints, this lasted until 1968 when the mintmark was moved from the reverse to the obverse side of the coin.

Pre-War Composition (75% copper, 25% nickel) 1938-1942
Year	Mint	Mintage	Comments
1938	(P)	19,515,365	First year of issue
1938	D	5,376,000	
1938	S	4,105,000	
1939	(P)	120,627,535	
1939	D	3,514,000	Semi-key date
1939	S	6,630,000	
1940	(P)	176,499,158	
1940	D	43,540,000	
1940	S	39,690,000	
1941	(P)	203,283,720	
1941	D	53,432,000	
1941	S	43,445,000	
1942	(P)	49,818,600	
1942	D	13,938,000	

Wartime Composition (56% copper, 35% silver, 9% manganese) 1942-1945
Year	Mint	Mintage	Comments
1942	P	57,900,600	Can be told apart from the non-silver nickels since these have a mintmark above Monticello.
1942	S	32,900,000	
1943	P	271,165,000	
1943	D	15,294,000	
1943	S	104,060,000	
1944	P	119,150,000	
1944	D	32,309,000	
1944	S	21,640,000	
1945	P	119,408,100	
1945	D	37,158,000	
1945	S	58,939,000	

Post-War Composition (75% copper, 25% nickel) 1946-2003
Year	Mint	Mintage	Comments
1946	(P)	161,116,000	
1946	D	45,292,200	
1946	S	13,560,000	
1947	(P)	95,000,000	
1947	D	37,822,000	
1947	S	24,720,000	
1948	(P)	89,348,000	
1948	D	44,734,000	
1948	S	11,300,000	
1949	(P)	60,652,000	
1949	D	36,498,000	
1949	S	9,716,000	
1950	(P)	9,847,386	
1950	D	2,630,030	Key date (lowest non-proof standard Jefferson Nickel)
1951	(P)	28,609,500	
1951	D	20,460,000	
1951	S	7,776,000	
1952	(P)	64,069,980	
1952	D	30,638,000	
1952	S	20,572,000	
1953	(P)	46,772,800	
1953	D	59,878,600	
1953	S	19,210,900	
1954	(P)	47,917,350	
1954	D	117,136,560	
1954	S	29,384,000	
1955	(P)	8,266,200	
1955	D	74,464,100	
1956	(P)	35,885,384	
1956	D	67,222,940	
1957	(P)	39,655,952	
1957	D	136,828,900	
1958	(P)	17,963,652	
1958	D	168,249,120	
1959	(P)	28,397,291	
1959	D	160,738,240	
1960	(P)	57,107,602	
1960	D	192,582,180	
1961	(P)	76,668,244	
1961	D	229,342,760	
1962	(P)	110,602,019	
1962	D	280,195,720	
1963	(P)	178,851,645	
1963	D	276,829,460	
1964	(P)	1,028,622,762	
1964	D	1,787,297,160	
1965	(P/D/S)	136,131,380	Mintmarks suspended until 1968 to discourage coin collecting.
1966	(P/D/S)	156,208,283	Mintmarks suspended until 1968 to discourage coin collecting.
1967	(P/D/S)	107,325,800	Mintmarks suspended until 1968 to discourage coin collecting.
1968	D	91,227,880	
1968	S	100,396,004	
1969	D	202,807,500	
1969	S	123,099,631	
1970	D	515,485,380	
1970	S	241,464,814	
1971	(P)	106,884,000	
1971	D	316,144,800	
1971	S	3,220,733	Proof only. Includes the very rare "No S" variety, of which there are ~200 known.
1972	(P)	202,036,000	
1972	D	351,694,600	
1972	S	3,260,996	Proof only
1973	(P)	384,396,000	
1973	D	261,405,000	
1973	S	2,760,339	Proof only
1974	(P)	601,752,000	
1974	D	277,373,000	
1974	S	2,612,568	Proof only
1975	(P)	181,772,000	
1975	D	401,875,300	
1975	S	2,845,450	Proof only
1976	(P)	367,124,000	
1976	D	563,964,147	
1976	S	2,845,450	Proof only
1977	(P)	585,376,000	
1977	D	297,313,460	
1977	S	3,251,152	Proof only
1978	(P)	391,308,000	
1978	D	313,092,780	
1978	S	3,127,781	Proof only
1979	(P)	463,188,000	
1979	D	325,867,672	
1979	S	3,677,175	Proof only
1980	P	593,004,000	"P" mintmark added to the obverse of the coin.
1980	D	502,323,448	
1980	S	3,554,806	Proof only
1981	P	657,504,000	
1981	D	364,801,843	
1981	S	4,063,083	Proof only
1982	P	292,355,000	
1982	D	373,726,544	
1982	S	3,857,479	Proof only
1983	P	561,615,000	
1983	D	536,726,276	
1983	S	3,279,126	Proof only
1984	P	746,769,000	
1984	D	517,675,146	
1984	S	3,065,110	Proof only
1985	P	647,114,962	
1985	D	459,747,446	
1985	S	3,362,821	Proof only
1986	P	536,883,483	
1986	D	361,819,140	
1986	S	3,010,497	Proof only
1987	P	371,499,481	
1987	D	410,590,604	
1987	S	4,227,728	Proof only
1988	P	771,360,000	
1988	D	663,771,652	
1988	S	3,262,948	Proof only
1989	P	898,812,000	
1989	D	570,842,474	
1989	S	3,220,194	Proof only
1990	P	661,636,000	
1990	D	663,938,503	
1990	S	3,299,559	Proof only
1991	P	614,104,000	
1991	D	436,496,678	
1991	S	2,867,787	Proof only
1992	P	399,552,000	
1992	D	450,565,113	
1992	S	4,176,560	Proof only
1993	P	412,076,000	
1993	D	406,084,135	
1993	S	3,394,792	Proof only
1994	P	722,160,000	
1994	P	167,703	Special Frosted Matte Uncirculated. Included in collector's sets.
1994	D	715,762,110	
1994	S	3,269,923	Proof only
1995	P	774,156,000	
1995	D	888,112,000	
1995	S	2,797,481	Proof only
1996	P	829,332,000	
1996	D	817,736,000	
1996	S	2,525,625	Proof only
1997	P	470,972,000	
1997	P	25,000	Special Frosted Matte Uncirculated. Rare - Included in collector's sets.
1997	D	466,640,000	
1997	S	2,796,678	Proof only
1998	P	688,292,000	
1998	D	635,380,000	
1998	S	2,086,507	Proof only
1999	P	1,212,000,000	
1999	D	1,066,720,000	
1999	S	3,347,966	Proof only
2000	P	846,240,000	
2000	D	1,509,220,000	
2000	S	4,047,993	Proof only
2001	P	675,704,000	
2001	D	627,680,000	
2001	S	3,184,606	Proof only
2002	P	529,280,000	
2002	D	691,200,000	
2002	S	3,211,995	Proof only
2003	P	441,840,000	
2003	D	383,040,000	
2003	S	3,298,439	Proof only

Westward Journey Series, 2004-2005
Year	Mint	Mintage	Comments
2004	P	361,440,000	Louisiana Purchase reverse
2004	D	372,000,000	Louisiana Purchase reverse
2004	S	2,992,069	Louisiana Purchase reverse, proof only
2004	P	366,720,000	Keelboat reverse
2004	D	344,880,000	Keelboat reverse
2004	S	2,965,422	Keelboat reverse, proof only
2005	P	448,320,000	American Bison reverse
2005	D	487,680,000	American Bison reverse
2005	S	3,344,679	American Bison reverse, proof only
2005	P	394,080,000	Ocean in View reverse
2005	D	411,120,000	Ocean in View reverse
2005	S	3,344,679	Ocean in View reverse, proof only

Return to Monticello (75% copper, 25% nickel) 2006–Present
Year	Mint	Mintage	Comments
2006	P	693,120,000	
2006	D	809,280,000	
2006	S	3,054,436	Proof only
2007	P	571,680,000	
2007	D	626,160,000	
2007	S	2,577,166	Proof only
2008	P	279,840,000	
2008	D	345,600,000	
2008	S	2,169,561	Proof only
2009	P	39,840,000	the Great Recession caused low mintage numbers not seen since the 1950s.
2009	D	46,800,000	
2009	S	2,179,867	Proof only
2010	P	260,640,000	
2010	D	229,920,000	
2010	S	1,689,216	Proof only
2011	P	450,000,000	
2011	D	540,240,000	
2011	S	1,673,010	Proof only
2012	P	464,640,000	
2012	D	558,960,000	
2012	S	1,239,148	Proof only
2013	P	607,440,000	
2013	D	615,600,000	
2013	S	1,274,505	Proof only
2014	P	635,520,000	
2014	D	570,720,000	
2014	S	1,193,735	Proof only
2015	P	752,880,000	
2015	D	846,720,000	
2015	S	1,099,413	Proof only
2016	P	786,960,000	
2016	D	759,600,000	
2016	S	1,011,684	Proof only
2017	P	710,160,000	
2017	D	663,120,000	
2017	S	979,498	Proof only
2017	S	223,310	Enhanced Uncirculated
2018	P	629,520,000	
2018	D	626,880,000	
2018	S	898,986	Proof only
2018	S	199,177	Reverse proof
2019	P	567,854,400	
2019	D	527,040,000	
2019	S	989,862	Proof only
2020	P	785,500,000	
2020	D	837,600,000	
2020	S	777,913	Proof only
2020	W	464,730	Proof
2020	W	313,183	Reverse proof
2021	P	772,780,000	
2021	D	798,000,000	
2021	S	513,866	Proof only
2022	P	769,920,000	
2022	D	777,600,000	
2022	S	400,002	Proof only
2023	P	692,600,000	
2023	D	734,800,000	
2023	S	369,236	Proof only
2024	P	79,920,000	
2024	D	32,880,000	
2024	S	355,786	Proof only
2025	P	443,840,000	
2025	D	322,320,000	
2025	S	304,725	Proof only

== See also ==
- United States cent mintage figures
  - Lincoln cent mintage figures
- Roosevelt dime mintage figures
- United States quarter mintage figures
  - Washington quarter mintage figures
  - 50 State quarter mintage figures
  - America the Beautiful quarter mintage figures
  - American Women quarters
- United States half dollar mintage figures
  - Kennedy half dollar mintage figures
- American Silver Eagle mintage figures
