= Lincoln cent mintage figures =

United States coin production data

Below are the mintage figures for the Lincoln cent. 2025 was the last year the Mint issued cents for general circulation. Beginning in 2026, the coins have been minted in smaller numbers and sold only to collectors at premiums above the face value.

The following mint marks indicate which mint the coin was made at (parentheses indicate a lack of a mint mark):

P = Philadelphia Mint

D = Denver Mint

S = San Francisco Mint

W = West Point Mint

== Lincoln Wheat reverse ==
VDB on reverse, 1909 (Bronze)
| Year | Mint | Mintage | Comments |
|---|---|---|---|
| 1909 | (P) | 27,995,000 | |
| 1909 | S | 484,000 | |
| 1909 | (P) | 1,194 | Matte proof |

No VDB on reverse, 1909–1917 (Bronze)
| Year | Mint | Mintage | Comments |
|---|---|---|---|
| 1909 | (P) | 72,702,618 | |
| 1909 | S | 1,825,000 | |
| 1909 | (P) | 2,352 | Matte proof |
| 1910 | (P) | 146,801,218 | |
| 1910 | S | 6,045,000 | |
| 1910 | (P) | 4,083 | Matte proof |
| 1911 | (P) | 101,177,787 | |
| 1911 | D | 12,672,000 | First time Denver produced the cent |
| 1911 | S | 4,026,000 | |
| 1911 | (P) | 2,411 | Matte proof |
| 1912 | (P) | 68,153,060 | |
| 1912 | D | 10,411,000 | |
| 1912 | S | 4,431,000 | |
| 1912 | (P) | 2,145 | Matte proof |
| 1913 | (P) | 76,532,352 | |
| 1913 | D | 15,804,000 | |
| 1913 | S | 6,101,000 | |
| 1913 | (P) | 2,848 | Matte proof |
| 1914 | (P) | 75,238,432 | |
| 1914 | D | 1,193,000 | Many counterfeits exist |
| 1914 | S | 4,137,000 | |
| 1914 | (P) | 1,365 | Matte proof |
| 1915 | (P) | 29,092,120 | |
| 1915 | D | 22,050,000 | |
| 1915 | S | 4,833,000 | |
| 1915 | (P) | 1,050 | Matte proof |
| 1916 | (P) | 131,832,627 | |
| 1916 | D | 35,956,000 | |
| 1916 | S | 22,510,000 | |
| 1916 | (P) | 1,050 | Matte proof |
| 1917 | (P) | 196,429,785 | |
| 1917 | D | 55,120,000 | |
| 1917 | S | 32,620,000 | |
| 1917 | (P) | ? | Matte proof, struck illegally, 1 known to exist |

VDB on Lincoln's bust, 1918–1942 (Bronze)
| Year | Mint | Mintage | Comments |
|---|---|---|---|
| 1918 | (P) | 288,104,634 | |
| 1918 | D | 47,830,000 | |
| 1918 | S | 34,680,000 | |
| 1919 | (P) | 392,021,000 | |
| 1919 | D | 57,154,000 | |
| 1919 | S | 139,760,000 | |
| 1920 | (P) | 310,165,000 | |
| 1920 | D | 49,280,000 | |
| 1920 | S | 46,220,000 | |
| 1921 | (P) | 39,157,000 | |
| 1921 | S | 15,274,000 | |
| 1922 | D | 7,160,000 | |
| 1922 | (D) | ^ | Error, many counterfeits exist |
| 1923 | (P) | 74,723,000 | |
| 1923 | S | 8,700,000 | |
| 1924 | (P) | 75,178,000 | |
| 1924 | D | 2,520,000 | |
| 1924 | S | 11,696,000 | |
| 1925 | (P) | 139,949,000 | |
| 1925 | D | 22,580,000 | |
| 1925 | S | 26,380,000 | |
| 1926 | (P) | 157,088,000 | |
| 1926 | D | 28,020,000 | |
| 1926 | S | 4,550,000 | |
| 1927 | (P) | 144,440,000 | |
| 1927 | D | 27,170,000 | |
| 1927 | S | 14,276,000 | |
| 1928 | (P) | 134,116,000 | |
| 1928 | D | 31,170,000 | |
| 1928 | S | 17,266,000 | |
| 1929 | (P) | 185,262,000 | |
| 1929 | D | 41,730,000 | |
| 1929 | S | 50,148,000 | |
| 1930 | (P) | 157,415,000 | |
| 1930 | D | 40,100,000 | |
| 1930 | S | 24,286,000 | |
| 1931 | (P) | 19,396,000 | |
| 1931 | D | 4,480,000 | |
| 1931 | S | 866,000 | |
| 1932 | (P) | 9,062,000 | |
| 1932 | D | 10,500,000 | |
| 1933 | (P) | 14,360,000 | |
| 1933 | D | 6,200,000 | |
| 1934 | (P) | 219,080,000 | |
| 1934 | D | 28,446,000 | |
| 1935 | (P) | 245,388,000 | |
| 1935 | D | 47,000,000 | |
| 1935 | S | 38,702,000 | |
| 1936 | (P) | 309,632,000 | |
| 1936 | D | 40,620,000 | |
| 1936 | S | 29,130,000 | |
| 1936 | (P) | 5,569 | Proof, Satin finish (Type 1) |
| 1936 | (P) | ^ | Proof, Brilliant finish (Type 2) |
| 1937 | (P) | 309,170,000 | |
| 1937 | D | 50,430,000 | |
| 1937 | S | 34,500,000 | |
| 1937 | (P) | 9,320 | Proof |
| 1938 | (P) | 156,682,000 | |
| 1938 | D | 20,010,000 | |
| 1938 | S | 15,180,000 | |
| 1938 | (P) | 14,734 | Proof |
| 1939 | (P) | 316,466,000 | |
| 1939 | D | 15,160,000 | |
| 1939 | S | 52,070,000 | |
| 1939 | (P) | 13,520 | Proof |
| 1940 | (P) | 586,810,000 | |
| 1940 | D | 81,390,000 | |
| 1940 | S | 112,940,000 | |
| 1940 | (P) | 15,872 | Proof |
| 1941 | (P) | 887,018,000 | |
| 1941 | D | 128,700,000 | |
| 1941 | S | 92,360,000 | |
| 1941 | (P) | 21,100 | Proof |
| 1942 | (P) | 657,796,000 | |
| 1942 | (P) | c2 | White metal pattern |
| 1942 | (P) | c1 | Aluminum pattern |
| 1942 | (P) | ? | Copper-plated Steel pattern |
| 1942 | (P) | ? | Zinc-plated Steel pattern |
| 1942 | D | 206,698,000 | |
| 1942 | S | 85,590,000 | |
| 1942 | (P) | 32,600 | Proof |

Wartime cent, 1943 (Zinc-plated Steel except as noted)
| Year | Mint | Mintage | Comments |
|---|---|---|---|
| 1943 | (P) | 684,628,670 | |
| 1943 | (P) | c40 | 12 known to exist in Bronze. |
| 1943 | D | 217,660,000 | |
| 1943 | D | ? | Currently unique in Bronze. |
| 1943 | S | 191,550,000 | |
| 1943 | S | ? | 4 known to exist in Bronze. |

Wartime cent, 1944–1946 (Brass except as noted)
| Year | Mint | Mintage | Comments |
|---|---|---|---|
| 1944 | (P) | 1,435,000,000 | |
| 1944 | (P) | >27 | Zinc-plated Steel. 27 known. |
| 1944 | D | 430,578,000 | |
| 1944 | D | ^ | D over S |
| 1944 | D | c10 | Zinc-plated Steel. 7-10 known. |
| 1944 | S | 282,760,000 | |
| 1944 | S | >1 | Zinc-plated Steel. Only 1 known. |
| 1945 | (P) | 1,040,515,000 | |
| 1945 | D | 266,268,000 | |
| 1945 | S | 181,770,000 | |
| 1946 | (P) | 991,655,000 | |
| 1946 | D | 315,690,000 | |
| 1946 | S | 198,100,000 | |

Post-war wheat cent, 1947–1958 (Bronze)
| Year | Mint | Mintage | Comments |
|---|---|---|---|
| 1947 | (P) | 190,555,000 | |
| 1947 | D | 194,750,000 | |
| 1947 | S | 99,000,000 | |
| 1948 | (P) | 317,570,000 | |
| 1948 | D | 172,637,500 | |
| 1948 | S | 81,735,000 | |
| 1949 | (P) | 217,775,000 | |
| 1949 | D | 153,132,500 | |
| 1949 | S | 64,290,000 | |
| 1950 | (P) | 272,635,000 | |
| 1950 | D | 334,950,000 | |
| 1950 | S | 118,505,000 | |
| 1950 | (P) | 51,383 | Proof |
| 1951 | (P) | 284,576,000 | |
| 1951 | D | 625,355,000 | |
| 1951 | S | 136,010,000 | |
| 1951 | (P) | 57,500 | Proof |
| 1952 | (P) | 186,775,000 | |
| 1952 | D | 746,130,000 | |
| 1952 | S | 137,800,004 | |
| 1952 | (P) | 81,980 | Proof |
| 1953 | (P) | 256,755,000 | |
| 1953 | D | 700,515,000 | |
| 1953 | S | 181,835,000 | |
| 1953 | (P) | 128,800 | Proof |
| 1954 | (P) | 71,640,050 | |
| 1954 | D | 251,552,500 | |
| 1954 | S | 96,190,000 | |
| 1954 | (P) | 233,300 | Proof |
| 1955 | (P) | 330,580,000 | Doubled-Die varieties have been found |
| 1955 | D | 563,257,500 | |
| 1955 | S | 44,610,000 | |
| 1955 | (P) | 378,200 | Proof |
| 1956 | (P) | 420,745,000 | |
| 1956 | D | 1,098,201,100 | |
| 1956 | (P) | 669,384 | Proof |
| 1957 | (P) | 282,540,000 | |
| 1957 | D | 1,051,342,000 | |
| 1957 | (P) | 1,247,952 | Proof |
| 1958 | (P) | 252,525,000 | |
| 1958 | D | 800,953,300 | |
| 1958 | (P) | 875,652 | Proof |

=== Fraser's Lincoln cent ===
James E. Fraser's Lincoln cent pattern, 1952 (Bronze)
| Year | Mint | Mintage | Comments |
|---|---|---|---|
| 1952 | (P) | 146 | Pattern. None released to the public. |

== Lincoln Memorial reverse ==
Lincoln Memorial cent, 1959–1961 (Bronze)
| Year | Mint | Mintage | Comments |
|---|---|---|---|
| 1959 | (P) | 609,715,000 | |
| 1959 | D | 1,279,760,000 | |
| 1959 | (P) | 1,149,291 | Proof |
| 1960 | (P) | 586,405,000 | Small and Large date varieties |
| 1960 | D | 1,580,884,000 | Small and Large date varieties |
| 1960 | (P) | 1,691,602 | Proof, Large Date |
| 1960 | (P) | ^ | Proof, Small Date |
| 1961 | (P) | 753,345,000 | |
| 1961 | D | 1,753,266,700 | |
| 1961 | (P) | 3,028,244 | Proof |

Lincoln Memorial cent, 1962–1982 (Bronze except as noted)
| Year | Mint | Mintage | Comments |
|---|---|---|---|
| 1962 | (P) | 606,045,000 | |
| 1962 | D | 1,793,148,400 | |
| 1962 | (P) | 3,218,019 | Proof |
| 1963 | (P) | 754,110,000 | |
| 1963 | D | 1,774,020,400 | |
| 1963 | (P) | 3,075,645 | Proof |
| 1964 | (P) | 2,451,945,000 | 932,780,000 of these were struck in 1965 |
| 1964 | D | 3,799,071,500 | 1,933,908,100 of these were struck in 1965 |
| 1964 | (S) | 196,630,000 | All of these were struck in 1965 |
| 1964 | (P) | 3,950,762 | Proof |
| 1965 | (P) | 301,470,000 | 300,385,000 of these were struck in 1966 |
| 1965 | (D) | 973,364,900 | All of these were struck in 1966 |
| 1965 | (S) | 220,030,000 | All of these were struck in 1966 |
| 1965 | (S) | 2,360,000 | Special Mint Set, satin finish All of these were struck in 1966 |
| 1966 | (P) | 811,100,000 | |
| 1966 | (D) | 991,431,200 | |
| 1966 | (S) | 383,355,000 | |
| 1966 | (S) | 2,261,583 | Special Mint Set, satin finish |
| 1967 | (P) | 907,575,000 | |
| 1967 | (D) | 1,327,377,100 | |
| 1967 | (S) | 813,715,000 | |
| 1967 | (S) | 1,863,344 | Special Mint Set, satin finish |
| 1968 | (P) | 1,707,880,970 | |
| 1968 | D | 2,886,269,600 | |
| 1968 | S | 258,270,001 | Lowest minted non-proof memorial coin |
| 1968 | S | 3,041,506 | Proof |
| 1969 | (P) | 1,136,910,000 | |
| 1969 | D | 4,002,832,200 | |
| 1969 | S | 544,375,000 | Doubled-Die varieties have been found |
| 1969 | S | 2,934,631 | Proof |
| 1970 | (P) | 1,898,315,000 | |
| 1970 | D | 2,891,438,900 | |
| 1970 | S | 690,560,004 | Small and Large date varieties |
| 1970 | S | 2,632,810 | Proof, Small Date (High 7) |
| 1970 | S | ^ | Proof, Large Date (Low 7) |
| 1971 | (P) | 1,919,490,000 | |
| 1971 | D | 2,911,045,600 | |
| 1971 | S | 525,133,459 | |
| 1971 | S | 3,220,733 | Proof |
| 1972 | (P) | 2,933,255,000 | Doubled-Die varieties have been found |
| 1972 | D | 2,665,071,400 | |
| 1972 | S | 376,939,108 | |
| 1972 | S | 3,260,996 | Proof |
| 1973 | (P) | 3,728,245,000 | |
| 1973 | D | 3,549,576,588 | |
| 1973 | S | 317,177,295 | |
| 1973 | S | 2,760,339 | Proof |
| 1974 | (P) | 4,103,183,000 | |
| 1974 | (W) | 128,957,523 | First time West Point produced the cent |
| 1974 | (P) | 1,570,000 | Aluminum pattern. None released to the public. |
| 1974 | (P) | 1,570,000 | Bronze-plated steel pattern. None released to the public. |
| 1974 | D | 4,235,098,000 | |
| 1974 | D | c10 | Aluminum pattern. None released to the public. |
| 1974 | S | 409,426,660 | |
| 1974 | S | 2,612,568 | Proof |
| 1975 | (P) | 3,874,182,000 | |
| 1975 | (P) | 66 | Aluminum pattern. None released to the public. |
| 1975 | (W) | 1,577,294,142 | |
| 1975 | D | 4,505,275,300 | |
| 1975 | S | 2,845,450 | Proof business strike were not minted but some error coins have been found in this variety |
| 1976 | (P) | 3,133,580,000 | |
| 1976 | (W) | 1,540,695,000 | |
| 1976 | D | 4,221,592,455 | |
| 1976 | S | 4,149,730 | Proof only |
| 1977 | (P) | 3,074,575,000 | |
| 1977 | (W) | 1,395,355,000 | |
| 1977 | D | 4,194,062,300 | |
| 1977 | S | 3,251,152 | Proof only |
| 1978 | (P) | 3,735,655,000 | |
| 1978 | (W) | 1,531,250,000 | |
| 1978 | D | 4,280,233,400 | |
| 1978 | (S) | 291,700,000 | |
| 1978 | S | 3,127,781 | Proof only |
| 1979 | (P) | 3,560,940,000 | |
| 1979 | (W) | 1,705,850,000 | |
| 1979 | D | 4,139,357,254 | |
| 1979 | (S) | 751,725,000 | |
| 1979 | S | 3,677,175 | Proof only, Filled S |
| 1979 | S | ^ | Proof only, Clear S |
| 1980 | (P) | 4,653,915,000 | |
| 1980 | (W) | 1,576,200,000 | |
| 1980 | D | 5,140,098,660 | |
| 1980 | (S) | 1,184,590,000 | |
| 1980 | S | 3,554,806 | Proof only |
| 1981 | (P) | 7,491,750,000 | |
| 1981 | (W) | ^ | |
| 1981 | D | 5,373,235,677 | |
| 1981 | S | 4,063,083 | Proof, Filled S |
| 1981 | S | ^ | Proof, Clear S |
| 1982 | (P) | 10,712,525,000 | |
| 1982 | (P) | ^ | Copper-plated Zinc |
| 1982 | (W) | ^ | Copper-plated Zinc |
| 1982 | D | 6,012,979,368 | |
| 1982 | D | ^ | Copper-plated Zinc |
| 1982 | S | 3,857,479 | Proof only |

Lincoln Memorial cent, 1983–2008 (Copper-plated Zinc)
| Year | Mint | Mintage | Comments |
|---|---|---|---|
| 1983 | (P) | 7,752,355,000 | |
| 1983 | (W) | ^ | |
| 1983 | D | 6,467,199,428 | |
| 1983 | S | 3,279,126 | Proof only |
| 1984 | (P) | 8,151,079,000 | |
| 1984 | (W) | ^ | |
| 1984 | D | 5,569,238,906 | |
| 1984 | S | 3,065,110 | Proof only |
| 1985 | (P) | 5,648,489,887 | |
| 1985 | (W) | ^ | |
| 1985 | D | 5,287,399,926 | |
| 1985 | S | 3,362,821 | Proof only |
| 1986 | (P) | 4,491,395,493 | |
| 1986 | (W) | ^ | |
| 1986 | D | 4,442,866,698 | |
| 1986 | S | 3,010,497 | Proof only |
| 1987 | (P) | 4,682,466,931 | |
| 1987 | D | 4,879,389,514 | |
| 1987 | S | 4,227,728 | Proof only |
| 1988 | (P) | 6,092,810,000 | |
| 1988 | D | 5,253,740,443 | |
| 1988 | S | 3,262,948 | Proof only |
| 1989 | (P) | 7,261,535,000 | |
| 1989 | D | 5,345,467,111 | |
| 1989 | S | 3,220,194 | Proof only |
| 1990 | (P) | 6,851,765,000 | |
| 1990 | D | 4,922,894,533 | |
| 1990 | S | 3,296,504 | Proof only |
| 1990 | (S) | 3,055 | Proof only, missing the S mint mark. |
| 1991 | (P) | 5,165,940,000 | |
| 1991 | D | 4,158,442,076 | |
| 1991 | S | 2,867,787 | Proof only |
| 1992 | (P) | 4,648,905,000 | |
| 1992 | D | 4,448,673,300 | |
| 1992 | S | 4,176,560 | Proof only |
| 1993 | (P) | 5,684,705,000 | |
| 1993 | D | 6,426,650,571 | |
| 1993 | S | 3,394,792 | Proof only |
| 1994 | (P) | 6,500,850,000 | |
| 1994 | D | 7,131,765,000 | |
| 1994 | S | 3,269,923 | Proof only |
| 1995 | (P) | 6,411,440,000 | |
| 1995 | D | 7,128,560,000 | |
| 1995 | S | 2,797,481 | Proof only |
| 1996 | (P) | 6,612,465,000 | |
| 1996 | D | 6,510,795,000 | |
| 1996 | S | 2,525,265 | Proof only |
| 1997 | (P) | 4,622,800,000 | |
| 1997 | D | 4,576,555,000 | |
| 1997 | S | 2,796,678 | Proof only |
| 1998 | (P) | 5,032,200,000 | |
| 1998 | D | 5,225,200,000 | |
| 1998 | S | 2,086,507 | Proof only |
| 1999 | (P) | 5,237,600,000 | |
| 1999 | D | 6,360,065,000 | |
| 1999 | S | 3,347,966 | Proof only |
| 2000 | (P) | 5,503,200,000 | |
| 2000 | D | 8,774,220,000 | |
| 2000 | S | 4,047,993 | Proof only |
| 2001 | (P) | 4,959,600,000 | |
| 2001 | D | 5,374,990,000 | |
| 2001 | S | 3,184,606 | Proof only |
| 2002 | (P) | 3,260,800,000 | |
| 2002 | D | 4,028,055,000 | |
| 2002 | S | 3,211,995 | Proof only |
| 2003 | (P) | 3,300,000,000 | |
| 2003 | D | 3,548,000,000 | |
| 2003 | S | 3,298,439 | Proof only |
| 2004 | (P) | 3,456,400,000 | |
| 2004 | D | 3,379,600,000 | |
| 2004 | S | 2,965,422 | Proof only |
| 2005 | (P) | 3,935,600,000 | |
| 2005 | D | 3,764,450,500 | |
| 2005 | S | 3,344,679 | Proof only |
| 2006 | (P) | 4,290,000,000 | |
| 2006 | D | 3,944,000,000 | |
| 2006 | S | 3,054,436 | Proof only |
| 2007 | (P) | 3,762,400,000 | |
| 2007 | D | 3,638,800,000 | |
| 2007 | S | 2,577,166 | Proof only |
| 2008 | (P) | 2,569,600,000 | |
| 2008 | D | 2,849,600,000 | |
| 2008 | S | 2,169,561 | Proof only |

== Lincoln Bicentennial series ==
Lincoln Bicentennial cent "Birthplace", 2009 (Copper-plated Zinc except as noted)
| Year | Mint | Mintage | Comments |
|---|---|---|---|
| 2009 | (P) | 284,800,000 | |
| 2009 | (P) | 784,614 | Satin uncirculated, struck in Bronze |
| 2009 | D | 350,000,000 | |
| 2009 | D | 784,614 | Satin uncirculated, struck in Bronze |
| 2009 | S | 2,995,615 | Proof only, struck in Bronze |

Lincoln Bicentennial cent "Formative Years", 2009 (Copper-plated Zinc except as noted)
| Year | Mint | Mintage | Comments |
|---|---|---|---|
| 2009 | (P) | 376,000,000 | Double-Die varieties have been found |
| 2009 | (P) | 784,614 | Satin uncirculated, struck in Bronze |
| 2009 | D | 363,600,000 | |
| 2009 | D | 784,614 | Satin uncirculated, struck in Bronze |
| 2009 | S | 2,995,615 | Proof only, struck in Brass Doubled-Die variety has been found |

Lincoln Bicentennial cent "Professional Life", 2009 (Copper-plated Zinc except as noted)
| Year | Mint | Mintage | Comments |
|---|---|---|---|
| 2009 | (P) | 316,000,000 | Professional Life |
| 2009 | (P) | 784,614 | Satin uncirculated, struck in Bronze |
| 2009 | D | 336,000,000 | Professional Life |
| 2009 | D | 784,614 | Satin uncirculated, struck in Bronze |
| 2009 | S | 2,995,615 | Proof only, struck in Bronze |

Lincoln Bicentennial cent "Presidency", 2009 (Copper-plated Zinc except as noted)
| Year | Mint | Mintage | Comments |
|---|---|---|---|
| 2009 | (P) | 129,600,000 | Presidency |
| 2009 | (P) | 784,614 | Satin uncirculated, struck in Bronze |
| 2009 | D | 198,000,000 | |
| 2009 | D | 784,614 | Satin uncirculated, struck in Bronze |
| 2009 | S | 2,995,615 | Proof only, struck in Bronze |

== Union Shield reverse ==
Lincoln Shield cent, 2010–present (Copper-plated Zinc)
| Year | Mint | Mintage | Comments |
|---|---|---|---|
| 2010 | (P) | 1,963,630,000 | |
| 2010 | D | 2,407,200,000 | |
| 2010 | S | 1,689,364 | Proof only |
| 2011 | (P) | 2,402,400,000 | |
| 2011 | D | 2,536,140,000 | |
| 2011 | S | 1,673,010 | Proof only |
| 2012 | (P) | 3,132,000,000 | |
| 2012 | D | 2,883,200,000 | |
| 2012 | S | 1,237,415 | Proof only |
| 2013 | (P) | 3,750,400,000 | |
| 2013 | D | 3,319,600,000 | |
| 2013 | S | 1,237,926 | Proof only |
| 2014 | (P) | 3,990,800,000 | |
| 2014 | D | 4,155,600,000 | |
| 2014 | S | 1,144,154 | Proof only |
| 2015 | (P) | 4,464,100,000 | |
| 2015 | D | 4,424,800,000 | |
| 2015 | S | 1,050,314 | Proof only |
| 2016 | (P) | 4,698,400,000 | |
| 2016 | D | 4,420,400,000 | |
| 2016 | S | 965,033 | Proof only |
| 2017 | P | 4,361,220,000 | Only year cent has displayed P mint mark (to commemorate 225th anniversary of the Philadelphia mint) |
| 2017 | D | 4,272,800,000 | |
| 2017 | S | 210,419 | Enhanced uncirculated |
| 2017 | S | 926,763 | Proof |
| 2018 | (P) | 4,066,800,000 | |
| 2018 | D | 3,738,400,000 | |
| 2018 | S | 849,355 | Proof only |
| 2018 | S | 199,116 | Reverse proof |
| 2019 | (P) | 3,542,800,000 | |
| 2019 | D | 3,497,600,000 | |
| 2019 | S | 989,862 | Proof only |
| 2019 | W | 318,695 | Uncirculated Only year cent has displayed W mint mark (to commemorate 110th anniversary of the Lincoln cent) |
| 2019 | W | 561,495 | Proof |
| 2019 | W | 383,590 | Reverse proof |
| 2020 | (P) | 3,560,800,000 | |
| 2020 | D | 4,035,600,000 | |
| 2020 | S | 777,913 | Proof only |
| 2021 | (P) | 3,925,820,000 | |
| 2021 | D | 3,982,800,000 | |
| 2021 | S | 816,662 | Proof only |
| 2022 | (P) | 3,129,200,000 | |
| 2022 | D | 3,230,400,000 | |
| 2022 | S | 649,365 | Proof only |
| 2023 | (P) | 2,262,000,000 | |
| 2023 | D | 2,260,800,000 | |
| 2023 | S | 369,236 | Proof only |
| 2024 | (P) | 1,712,000,000 | |
| 2024 | D | 1,513,200,000 | |
| 2024 | S | 355,786 | Proof only |
| 2025 | (P) | 655,200,000 | |
| 2025 | D | 645,200,000 | |
| 2025 | S | 304,725 | Proof only |

== See also ==
- United States cent mintage figures
- United States nickel mintage figures
- Roosevelt dime mintage figures
- United States quarter mintage figures
  - Washington quarter mintage figures
  - 50 State quarter mintage figures
  - America the Beautiful quarter mintage figures
  - American Women quarters
- United States half dollar mintage figures
  - Kennedy half dollar mintage figures
- American Silver Eagle mintage figures
