= United States quarter mintage figures =

Mintage figures of the United States quarter up to 1930

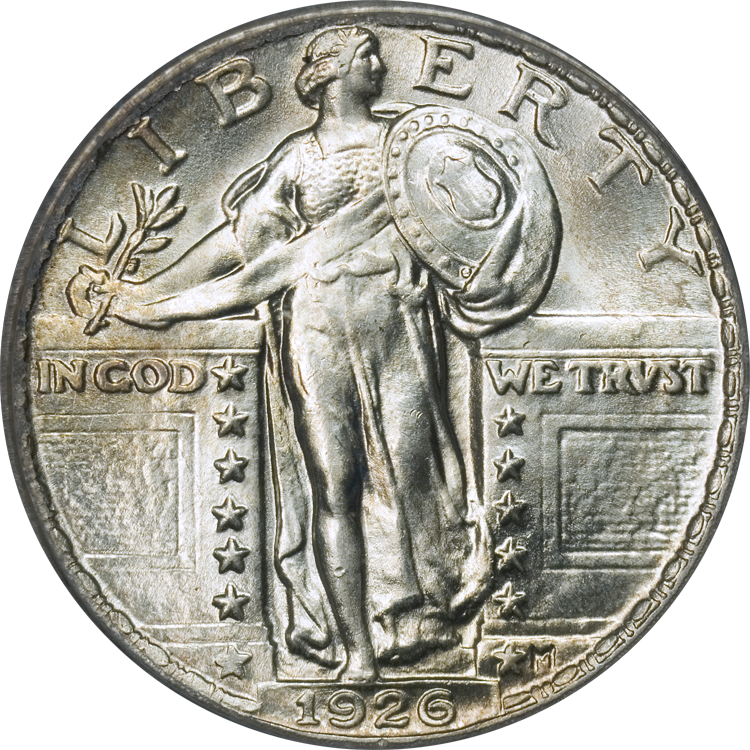
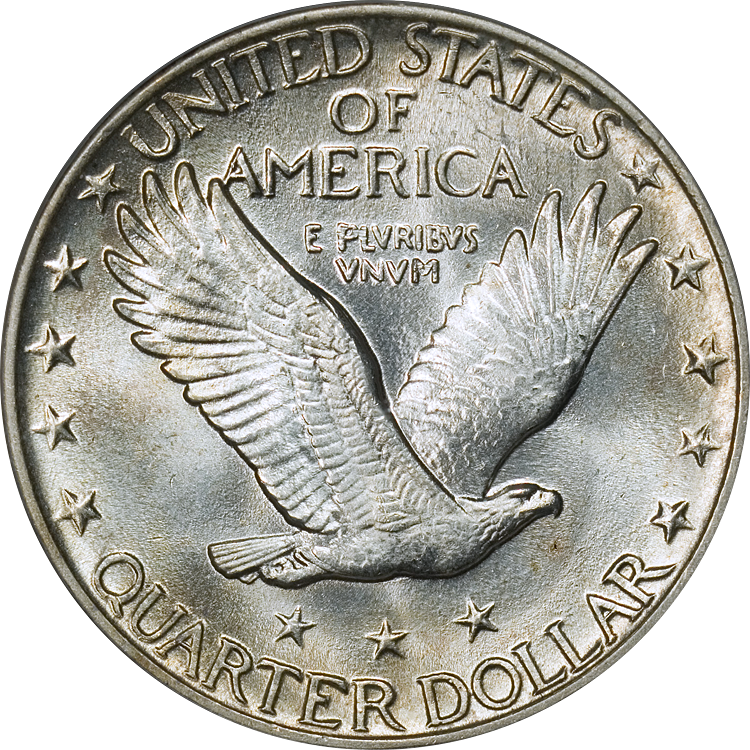
Standing Liberty quarter

Below are the mintage figures for the United States quarter up to 1930, before the Washington quarter design was introduced.

The following mint marks indicate which mint the coin was made at (parentheses indicate a lack of a mint mark):

P = Philadelphia Mint

D = Denver Mint

S = San Francisco Mint

W = West Point Mint

O = New Orleans Mint

CC = Carson City Mint

== Draped Bust quarter ==
=== Small Eagle Reverse ===
Small Eagle Reverse, 1796 (Silver)
Year	Mint	Mintage	Comments
1796	(P)	6,146	

=== Heraldic Eagle Reverse ===
Heraldic Eagle Reverse, 1804–1807 (Silver)
Year	Mint	Mintage	Comments
1804	(P)	6,738	
1805	(P)	121,394	
1806	(P)	206,124	6 over 5 overdate errors are known.
1807	(P)	220,643	

== Capped Bust quarter ==
=== Large diameter ===
Large diameter, 1815–1828 (Silver)
Year	Mint	Mintage	Comments
1815	(P)	89,235	
1818	(P)	361,174	8 over 5 overdate errors are known.
1819	(P)	144,000	
1820	(P)	127,444	
1820	(P)	10	Proof
1821	(P)	216,851	
1821	(P)	15	Proof
1822	(P)	64,080	25 over 50 overmark errors are known.
1822	(P)	14	Proof, figure includes six 25 over 50 overmark errors.
1823	(P)	17,800	All are 3 over 2 overdate errors.
1823	(P)	1	Proof, only known coin is a 3 over 2 overdate error.
1824	(P)	168,000	
1824	(P)	1	Proof, only known coin is a 4 over 2 overdate error.
1825	(P)	^	Included in 1824, all are 5 over 2 or 4 overdate errors.
1827	(P)	4,000	
1827	(P)	12	Proof, all known coins are 7 over 3 overdate errors.
1827	(P)	20	Proof restrike, all known coins are 7 over 3 overdate errors.
1828	(P)	102,000	25 over 50 overmark errors known.
1828	(P)	12	Proof

=== Small diameter ===
Small diameter, 1831–1838 (Silver)
Year	Mint	Mintage	Comments
1831	(P)	398,000	
1831	(P)	20	Proof
1832	(P)	320,000	
1833	(P)	156,000	O over F overmark errors are known.
1833	(P)	5	Proof
1834	(P)	286,000	O over F overmark errors are known.
1834	(P)	10	Proof
1835	(P)	1,952,000	
1835	(P)	8	Proof
1836	(P)	472,000	
1836	(P)	5	Proof
1837	(P)	252,400	
1837	(P)	5	Proof
1838	(P)	366,000	
1838	(P)	3	Proof

== Seated Liberty quarter ==
=== No drapery ===
No drapery, 1838–1840 (Silver)
Year	Mint	Mintage	Comments
1838	(P)	466,000	
1838	(P)	3	Proof
1839	(P)	491,146	
1839	(P)	2	Proof
1840	O	382,200	First time New Orleans produced the quarter.

=== No motto ===
No motto, arrows, or rays, 1840–1853 (Silver)
Year	Mint	Mintage	Comments
1840	(P)	188,127	
1840	O	43,000	
1840	(P)	5	Proof
1841	(P)	120,000	
1841	O	452,000	
1841	(P)	4	Proof
1842	(P)	88,000	
1842	O	769,000	
1842	(P)	6	Proof
1843	(P)	645,600	
1843	O	968,000	
1843	(P)	10	Proof
1844	(P)	421,200	
1844	O	740,000	
1844	(P)	5	Proof
1845	(P)	922,000	
1845	(P)	6	Proof
1846	(P)	510,000	
1846	(P)	12	Proof
1847	(P)	734,000	
1847	O	368,000	
1847	(P)	10	Proof
1848	(P)	146,000	
1848	(P)	10	Proof
1849	(P)	340,000	
1849	O	412,000	
1849	(P)	8	Proof
1850	(P)	190,800	
1850	O	^	Included in 1849-O
1850	(P)	3	Proof
1851	(P)	160,000	
1851	O	88,000	
1852	(P)	177,060	
1852	O	96,000	
1852	(P)	2	Proof
1853	(P)	44,200	

=== Arrows and rays, no motto ===
Arrows and rays, no motto, 1853 (Silver)
Year	Mint	Mintage	Comments
1853	(P)	15,210,020	3 over 4 overdate errors are known.
1853	O	1,332,000	
1853	(P)	5	Proof

=== Arrows, no rays or motto ===
Arrows, no rays or motto, 1854–1855 (Silver)
Year	Mint	Mintage	Comments
1854	(P)	12,380,000	
1854	O	1,484,000	
1854	(P)	10	Proof
1855	(P)	2,857,000	
1855	O	176,000	
1855	S	396,400	First time San Francisco produced the quarter.
1855	(P)	20	Proof
1855	S	2	Proof, first branch mint proof.

=== No motto, arrows, or rays (1856–1865) ===
No motto, arrows, or rays, 1856–1865 (Silver)
Year	Mint	Mintage	Comments
1856	(P)	7,264,000	
1856	O	968,000	
1856	S	286,000	Large S over small S overmark errors are known.
1856	(P)	30	Proof
1857	(P)	9,644,000	
1857	O	1,180,000	
1857	S	82,000	
1857	(P)	40	Proof
1858	(P)	7,368,000	
1858	O	520,000	
1858	S	121,000	
1858	(P)	300	Proof
1859	(P)	1,343,200	
1859	O	260,000	
1859	S	80,000	
1859	(P)	800	Proof
1860	(P)	804,400	
1860	O	388,000	
1860	S	56,000	
1860	(P)	1,000	Proof
1861	(P)	4,853,600	
1861	S	96,000	
1861	(P)	1,000	Proof
1862	(P)	932,000	
1862	S	67,000	
1862	(P)	550	Proof
1863	(P)	191,600	
1863	(P)	460	Proof
1864	(P)	93,600	
1864	S	20,000	
1864	(P)	470	Proof
1865	(P)	58,800	
1865	S	41,000	
1865	(P)	500	Proof
1866	(P)	?	Mint records do not state any were made. A single example is known to exist.

=== Motto, no arrows (1866–1873) ===
Motto, no arrows, 1866–1873 (Silver)
Year	Mint	Mintage	Comments
1866	(P)	16,800	
1866	S	28,000	
1866	(P)	725	Proof
1867	(P)	20,000	
1867	S	48,000	
1867	(P)	625	Proof
1868	(P)	29,400	
1868	S	96,000	
1868	(P)	600	Proof
1869	(P)	16,000	
1869	S	76,000	
1869	(P)	600	Proof
1870	(P)	86,400	
1870	CC	8,340	The first time Carson City produced the quarter.
1870	(P)	1,000	Proof
1871	(P)	118,200	
1871	S	30,900	
1871	CC	10,890	
1871	(P)	960	Proof
1872	(P)	182,000	
1872	S	83,000	
1872	CC	22,850	
1872	(P)	950	Proof
1873	(P)	212,000	
1873	CC	4,000	Mint records report a mintage of 4,000. Only 5 are known to exist.
1873	(P)	600	Proof

=== Motto and arrows ===
Motto and arrows, 1873–1874 (Silver)
Year	Mint	Mintage	Comments
1873	(P)	1,271,160	
1873	S	156,000	
1873	CC	12,462	
1874	(P)	471,200	
1874	S	392,000	
1874	(P)	540	Proof

=== Motto, no arrows (1875–1891) ===
Motto, no arrows, 1875–1891 (Silver)
Year	Mint	Mintage	Comments
1875	(P)	4,292,800	
1875	S	680,000	
1875	CC	140,000	
1875	(P)	700	Proof
1876	(P)	17,816,000	
1876	S	8,596,000	
1876	CC	4,944,000	
1876	(P)	1,150	Proof
1877	(P)	10,911,200	
1877	S	8,996,000	S over horizontal S overmark errors are known.
1877	CC	4,192,000	
1877	(P)	510	Proof
1878	(P)	2,260,000	
1878	S	140,000	
1878	CC	996,000	
1878	(P)	800	Proof
1879	(P)	13,600	
1879	(P)	1,100	Proof
1880	(P)	13,600	
1880	(P)	1,355	Proof
1881	(P)	12,000	
1881	(P)	975	Proof
1882	(P)	15,200	
1882	(P)	1,100	Proof
1883	(P)	14,400	
1883	(P)	1,039	Proof
1884	(P)	8,000	
1884	(P)	875	Proof
1885	(P)	13,600	
1885	(P)	930	Proof
1886	(P)	5,000	
1886	(P)	886	Proof
1887	(P)	10,000	
1887	(P)	710	Proof
1888	(P)	10,001	
1888	S	1,216,000	
1888	(P)	832	Proof
1889	(P)	12,000	
1889	(P)	711	Proof
1890	(P)	80,000	
1890	(P)	590	Proof
1891	(P)	3,920,000	
1891	O	68,000	
1891	S	2,216,000	
1891	(P)	600	Proof

== Barber quarter ==
Barber quarter, 1891–1916 (Silver)
Year	Mint	Mintage	Comments
1891	(P)	c. 2	Pattern only
1892	(P)	8,236,000	
1892	O	2,640,000	
1892	S	964,079	
1892	(P)	1,245	Proof
1893	(P)	5,444,023	
1893	O	3,396,000	
1893	S	1,454,535	
1893	(P)	792	Proof
1894	(P)	3,432,000	
1894	O	2,852,000	
1894	S	2,648,821	
1894	(P)	972	Proof
1895	(P)	4,440,000	
1895	O	2,816,000	
1895	S	1,764,681	
1895	(P)	880	Proof
1896	(P)	3,874,000	
1896	O	1,484,000	
1896	S	188,039	
1896	(P)	762	Proof
1897	(P)	8,140,000	
1897	O	1,414,800	
1897	S	542,229	
1897	(P)	731	Proof
1898	(P)	11,100,000	
1898	O	1,868,000	
1898	S	1,020,592	
1898	(P)	735	Proof
1899	(P)	12,624,000	
1899	O	2,644,000	
1899	S	708,000	
1899	(P)	846	Proof
1900	(P)	10,016,000	
1900	O	3,416,000	
1900	S	1,858,585	
1900	(P)	912	Proof
1901	(P)	8,892,000	
1901	O	1,612,000	
1901	S	72,664	
1901	(P)	813	Proof
1902	(P)	12,196,967	
1902	O	4,748,000	
1902	S	1,524,612	
1902	(P)	777	Proof
1903	(P)	9,669,309	
1903	O	3,500,000	
1903	S	1,036,000	
1903	(P)	755	Proof
1904	(P)	9,588,143	
1904	O	2,456,000	
1904	(P)	670	Proof
1905	(P)	4,967,523	
1905	O	1,230,000	
1905	S	1,884,000	
1905	(P)	727	Proof
1906	(P)	3,655,760	
1906	D	3,280,000	First time Denver produced the quarter.
1906	O	2,056,000	
1906	(P)	675	Proof
1907	(P)	7,192,000	
1907	D	2,484,000	
1907	O	4,560,000	
1907	S	1,360,000	
1907	(P)	575	Proof
1908	(P)	4,232,000	
1908	D	5,788,000	
1908	O	6,244,000	
1908	S	784,000	
1908	(P)	545	Proof
1909	(P)	9,268,000	
1909	D	5,114,000	
1909	O	712,000	
1909	S	1,348,000	
1909	(P)	650	Proof
1910	(P)	2,244,000	
1910	D	1,500,000	
1910	(P)	551	Proof
1911	(P)	3,720,000	
1911	D	933,600	
1911	S	988,000	
1911	(P)	543	Proof
1912	(P)	4,400,000	
1912	S	708,000	
1912	(P)	700	Proof
1913	(P)	484,000	
1913	D	1,450,800	
1913	S	40,000	
1913	(P)	613	Proof
1914	(P)	6,244,230	
1914	D	3,046,000	
1914	S	264,000	
1914	(P)	380	Proof
1915	(P)	3,480,000	
1915	D	3,694,000	
1915	S	704,000	
1915	(P)	450	Proof
1916	(P)	1,788,000	
1916	D	6,540,800	

== Standing Liberty quarter ==
=== Type 1, Exposed Breast ===
Type 1, Exposed Breast, No Stars Below Eagle, 1916–1917 (Silver)
Year	Mint	Mintage	Comments
1916	(P)	52,000	
1917	(P)	8,740,000	
1917	D	1,509,200	
1917	S	1,952,000	

=== Type 2, Covered Breast ===
Type 2, Covered Breast, Stars Below Eagle, 1917–1924 (Silver)
Year	Mint	Mintage	Comments
1917	(P)	13,880,000	
1917	D	6,224,400	
1917	S	5,552,000	
1918	(P)	14,240,000	
1918	D	7,380,800	
1918	S	11,072,000	8 over 7 overdate errors are known.
1919	(P)	11,324,000	
1919	D	1,944,000	
1919	S	1,836,000	
1920	(P)	27,860,000	
1920	D	3,586,400	
1920	S	6,380,000	
1921	(P)	1,916,000	
1923	(P)	9,716,000	
1923	S	1,360,000	
1924	(P)	10,920,000	
1924	D	3,112,000	
1924	S	2,860,000	

=== Type 3, Recessed Date ===
Type 3, Recessed Date, 1925–1930 (Silver)
Year	Mint	Mintage	Comments
1925	(P)	12,280,000	
1926	(P)	11,316,000	
1926	D	1,716,000	
1926	S	2,700,000	
1927	(P)	11,912,000	
1927	D	976,000	
1927	S	396,000	
1928	(P)	6,336,000	
1928	D	1,627,600	
1928	S	2,644,000	
1929	(P)	11,140,000	
1929	D	1,358,000	
1929	S	1,764,000	
1930	(P)	5,632,000	
1930	S	1,556,000	

=== Gold centennial issue ===
Gold centennial issue, 2016 (Gold)
Year	Mint	Mintage	Comments
2016	W	100,000	First time the W mint mark was used on the quarter.

== See also ==
- Washington quarter mintage figures
- 50 State quarter mintage figures
- America the Beautiful quarter mintage figures
- American Women quarters
- United States cent mintage figures
  - Lincoln cent mintage figures
- United States nickel mintage figures
- Roosevelt dime mintage figures
- United States half dollar mintage figures
  - Kennedy half dollar mintage figures
- American Silver Eagle mintage figures
