= American Silver Eagle mintage figures =

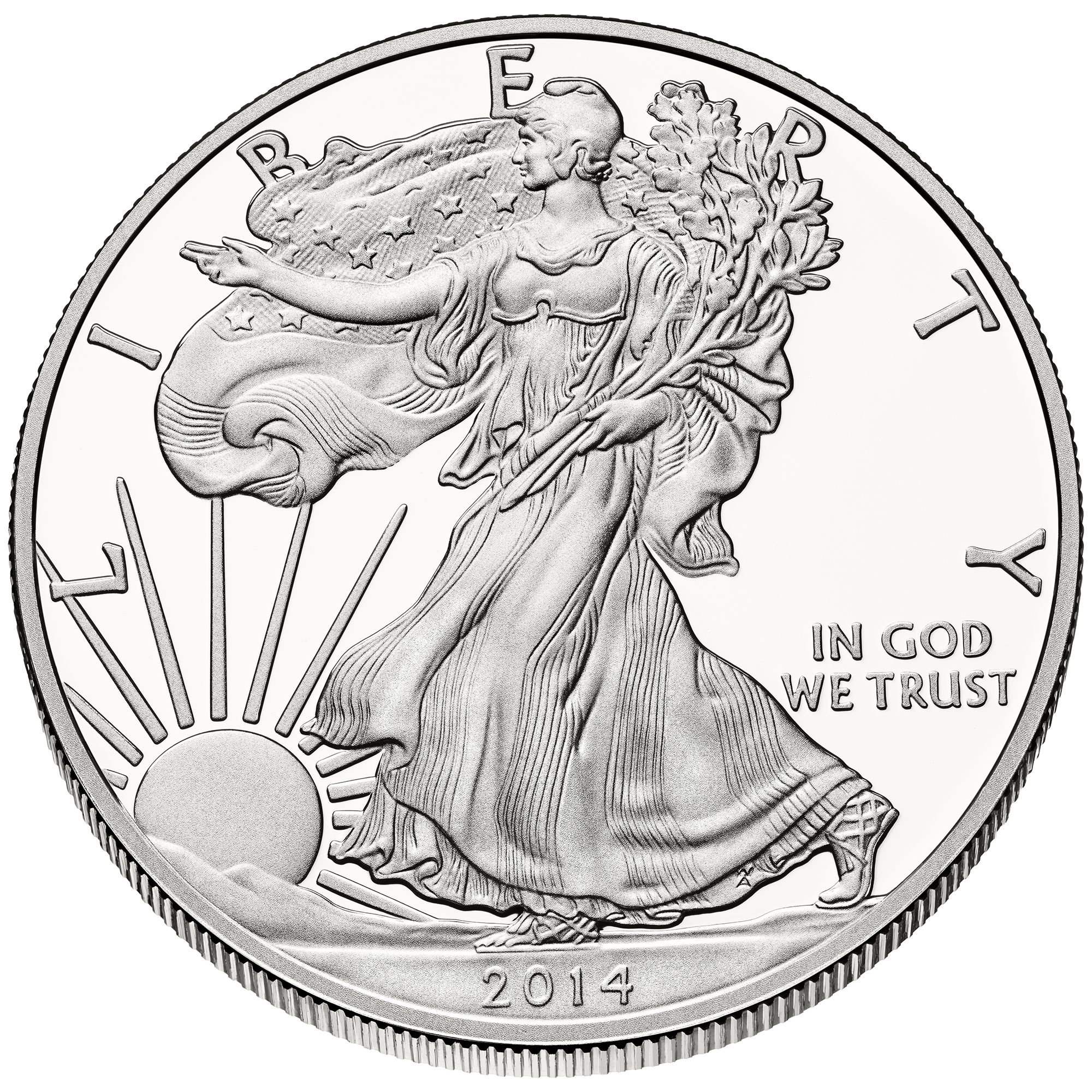
The obverse of the American Silver Eagle

The American Silver Eagle is a United States bullion coin that has been minted since 1986. Each coin is .999 fine silver. Circulating coins have been minted at the Philadelphia Mint, San Francisco Mint, and West Point Mint, though do not bear a mint mark. Proof and uncirculated coins do have mint marks. The reverse design was changed in 2021.

== Mintage figures ==
Year	Bullion	Proof	Uncirculated	Total
1986	5,393,005	-	-	5,393,005
1986-S	-	1,446,778	-	1,446,778
1987	11,442,335	-	-	11,442,335
1987-S	-	904,732	-	904,732
1988	5,004,646	-	-	5,004,646
1988-S	-	557,370	-	557,370
1989	5,203,327	-	-	5,203,327
1989-S	-	617,694	-	617,694
1990	5,840,110	-	-	5,840,110
1990-S	-	695,510	-	695,510
1991	7,191,066	-	-	7,191,066
1991-S	-	511,925	-	511,925
1992	5,540,068	-	-	5,540,068
1992-S	-	498,654	-	498,654
1993	6,763,762	-	-	6,763,762
1993-P	-	405,913	-	405,913
1994	4,227,319	-	-	4,227,319
1994-P	-	372,168	-	372,168
1995	4,672,051	-	-	4,672,051
1995-P	-	438,511	-	438,511
1995-W	-	30,125	-	30,125
1996	3,603,386	-	-	3,603,386
1996-P	-	500,000	-	500,000
1997	4,295,004	-	-	4,295,004
1997-P	-	435,368	-	435,368
1998	4,847,549	-	-	4,847,549
1998-P	-	450,000	-	450,000
1999	7,408,640	-	-	7,408,640
1999-P	-	549,796	-	549,796
2000	9,239,132	-	-	9,239,132
2000-P	-	600,000	-	600,000
2001	9,001,711	-	-	9,001,711
2001-W	-	746,398	-	746,398
2002	10,539,026	-	-	10,539,026
2002-W	-	647,342	-	647,342
2003	8,495,008	-	-	8,495,008
2003-W	-	747,831	-	747,831
2004	8,882,754	-	-	8,882,754
2004-W	-	801,602	-	801,602
2005	8,891,025	-	-	8,891,025
2005-W	-	816,663	-	816,663
2006	10,676,522	-	-	10,676,522
2006-P Rev. Pr.	-	248,875	-	248,875
2006-W	-	1,092,477	466,573	1,559,050
2007	9,028,036	-	-	9,028,036
2007-W	-	821,759	621,333	1,443,092
2008	20,583,000	-	-	20,583,000
2008-W	-	700,979	533,757	1,234,736
2009	30,459,000	-	-	30,459,000
2010	34,764,500	-	-	34,764,500
2010-W	-	849,861	-	849,861
2011	39,860,500	-	-	39,860,500
2011-P Rev. Pr.	-	100,000	-	100,000
2011-S	-	-	100,000	100,000
2011-W	-	947,355	409,766	1,357,121
2012	33,742,500	-	-	33,742,500
2012-S	-	285,184	-	285,184
2012-S Rev. Pr.	-	224,981	-	224,981
2012-W	-	869,386	226,120	1,095,506
2013	42,675,000	-	-	42,675,000
2013-W	-	934,812	222,091	1,156,903
2013-W Enh.	-	-	235,689	235,689
2013-W Rev. Pr.	-	235,689	-	235,689
2014	44,006,000	-	-	44,006,000
2014-W	-	944,757	253,169	1,197,926
2015	47,000,000	-	-	47,000,000
2015-W	-	707,518	223,879	931,397
2016	37,701,500	-	-	37,701,500
2016-W	-	651,467	237,753	889,220
2017	18,065,500	-	-	18,065,500
2017-S	-	-	123,799	123,799
2017-W	-	176,739	440,596	617,335
2018	15,700,000	-	-	15,700,000
2018-S	-	208,307	-	208,307
2018-W	-	418,522	138,947	557,469
2019	14,863,500	-	-	14,863,500
2019-S	-	202,206	-	202,206
2019-S Enh. Rev. Pr.	-	29,913	-	29,913
2019-W	-	410,334	141,638	551,972
2019-W Enh. Rev. Pr.	-	99,675	-	99,675
2020	31,329,500	-	-	31,329,500
2020-S	-	266,537	-	266,537
2020-W V75 Proof	-	74,709	-	74,709
2020-W	-	414,182	154,861	569,043
2021 Type 1	13,306,000	-	-	13,306,000
2021 Type 2	14,968,500	-	-	14,968,500
2021-S Type 2	-	274,536	-	274,536
2021-S Rev. Pr. Type 2	-	124,917	-	124,917
2021-W Type 1	-	416,047	-	416,047
2021-W Rev. Pr. Type 1	-	124,917	-	124,917
2021-W Type 2	-	385,776	187,891	573,667
2022	15,963,500	-	-	15,963,500
2022-S	-	366,371	-	366,371
2022-W	-	691,443	199,533	890,976
2023	24,750,000	-	-	24,750,000
2023-S	-	231,040	-	231,040
2023-W	-	560,403	160,865	721,268
2024	22,860,000	-	-	22,860,000
2024 Star privy mark	500,000	-	-	500,000
2024-S	-	177,227	-	177,227
2024-W	-	369,980	113,130	483,110
2025	11,568,000	-	-	11,568,000
2025 Eagle privy mark	500,000	-	-	500,000
2025-P United States Marine Corps	-	100,000	-	100,000
2025-S	-	158,008	-	158,008
2025-S United States Navy	-	100,000	-	100,000
2025-W	-	353,169	101,976	455,145
2025-W Laser beam privy mark	-	100,000	-	100,000
2025-W United States Army	-	100,000	-	100,000
2026	[data missing]	-	-	[data missing]
2026-P	-	[data missing]	-	[data missing]
2026-W	-	[data missing]	[data missing]	[data missing]
Total	671,351,982	29,272,704	5,029,221	705,653,907

== See also ==
- United States Mint coin production
- United States cent mintage figures
  - Lincoln cent mintage figures
- United States nickel mintage figures
- Roosevelt dime mintage figures
- United States quarter mintage figures
  - 50 State quarter mintage figures
  - America the Beautiful quarter mintage figures
  - American Women quarters
- United States half dollar mintage figures
  - Kennedy half dollar mintage figures
