= United States cent mintage figures =

Below are the mintage figures for the United States cent.

The following mint marks indicate which mint the coin was made at (parentheses indicate a lack of a mint mark):

P = Philadelphia Mint

D = Denver Mint

S = San Francisco Mint

W = West Point Mint

== Flowing Hair large cent ==
Flowing Hair large cent, 1793 (Copper)
Year	Mint	Mintage	Comments
1793	(P)	36,103	Chain reverse
1793	(P)	63,353	Wreath reverse

== Liberty Cap large cent ==
Liberty Cap large cent, 1793–1796 (Copper)
Year	Mint	Mintage	Comments
1793	(P)	11,056	
1794	(P)	918,521	
1795	(P)	37,000	Lettered edge
1795	(P)	501,500	Plain edge
1795	(P)	c9	Reeded edge, 9 known
1796	(P)	109,825	

== Draped Bust large cent ==
Draped Bust large cent, 1796–1807 (Copper)
Year	Mint	Mintage	Comments
1796	(P)	363,375	
1797	(P)	897,510	
1798	(P)	1,841,745	
1799	(P)	42,540	
1800	(P)	2,822,175	
1801	(P)	1,362,837	
1802	(P)	3,435,100	
1803	(P)	3,131,691	
1804	(P)	96,500	
1804	?	c68	Restrike, 68 known
1805	(P)	941,116	
1806	(P)	348,000	
1807	(P)	829,221	

== Classic Head large cent ==
Classic Head large cent, 1808–1815 (Copper)
Year	Mint	Mintage	Comments
1808	(P)	1,007,000	
1809	(P)	222,867	
1810	(P)	1,458,500	
1810	?	3	Restrike, 3 known
1811	(P)	218,025	
1812	(P)	1,075,500	
1813	(P)	418,000	
1814	(P)	357,830	
1815	(P)	2	Only 2 1815 large cents were produced, because of copper shortages for the War of 1812.

== Coronet Head large cent ==
=== Matron Head large cent ===
Matron Head large cent, 1816–1839 (Copper except as noted)
Year	Mint	Mintage	Comments
1816	(P)	2,820,982	
1817	(P)	3,948,400	
1817	(P)	5	Proof
1818	(P)	3,167,000	
1818	(P)	5	Proof
1819	(P)	2,671,000	
1819	(P)	8	Proof, figure includes three 9 over 8 overdate errors
1820	(P)	4,407,550	
1820	(P)	8	Proof
1821	(P)	389,000	
1821	(P)	15	Proof
1822	(P)	2,072,339	
1822	(P)	12	Proof
1823	(P)	1,262,000	
1823	(P)	10	Proof, figure includes five 3 over 2 overdate errors
1823	?	>200	Restrike, an estimated 240 examples exist
1823	?	c2	Silver restrike, an estimated 2 examples exist
1824	(P)	1,262,000	
1824	(P)	4	Proof
1825	(P)	1,461,100	
1825	(P)	5	Proof
1826	(P)	1,517,425	
1826	(P)	3	Proof
1827	(P)	2,357,732	
1827	(P)	15	Proof
1828	(P)	2,260,624	
1828	(P)	5	Proof
1829	(P)	1,414,500	
1829	(P)	12	Proof
1830	(P)	1,711,500	
1830	(P)	5	Proof
1831	(P)	3,359,260	
1831	(P)	20	Proof
1832	(P)	2,362,000	
1832	(P)	5	Proof
1833	(P)	2,739,000	
1833	(P)	5	Proof
1834	(P)	1,855,100	
1834	(P)	15	Proof
1835	(P)	3,878,400	
1835	(P)	5	Proof
1836	(P)	2,111,000	
1836	(P)	8	Proof
1837	(P)	5,558,300	
1837	(P)	8	Proof
1838	(P)	6,370,200	
1838	(P)	12	Proof
1839	(P)	3,128,661	
1839	(P)	1	Proof

=== Braided Hair large cent ===
Braided Hair large cent, 1839–1857; 1868 (Copper)
Year	Mint	Mintage	Comments
1839	(P)	200,000	
1840	(P)	2,462,700	
1840	(P)	15	Proof
1841	(P)	1,597,367	
1841	(P)	25	Proof
1842	(P)	2,383,390	
1842	(P)	15	Proof
1843	(P)	2,425,342	
1843	(P)	15	Proof
1844	(P)	2,398,752	
1844	(P)	20	Proof
1845	(P)	3,894,804	
1845	(P)	15	Proof
1846	(P)	4,120,800	
1846	(P)	22	Proof
1847	(P)	6,183,669	
1847	(P)	12	Proof
1848	(P)	6,415,799	
1848	(P)	7	Proof
1849	(P)	4,178,500	
1849	(P)	20	Proof
1850	(P)	4,426,844	
1850	(P)	8	Proof
1851	(P)	9,889,707	
1851	(P)	2	Proof
1852	(P)	5,063,094	
1852	(P)	10	Proof
1853	(P)	6,641,131	
1853	(P)	5	Proof
1854	(P)	4,236,156	
1854	(P)	50	Proof
1855	(P)	1,574,829	
1855	(P)	100	Proof
1856	(P)	2,690,463	
1856	(P)	100	Proof
1857	(P)	333,456	
1857	(P)	238	Proof
1868	(P)	c12	Struck in copper for collectors. About a dozen are known to exist.
1868	(P)	c7	Struck in nickel for collectors. Only 7 are known to exist.

== Flying Eagle cent ==
Flying Eagle cent, 1856–1858 (Cupronickel)
Year	Mint	Mintage	Comments
1856	(P)	634	
1856	(P)	1,500	Proof
1857	(P)	17,450,000	
1857	(P)	485	Proof
1858	(P)	24,600,000	
1858	(P)	200	Proof, small letters
1858	(P)	80	Proof, large letters

== Indian Head cent ==
=== Cupronickel Indian cent ===
No shield on reverse, 1859 (Cupronickel)
Year	Mint	Mintage	Comments
1859	(P)	36,400,000	
1859	(P)	800	Proof

Shield on reverse, 1860–1864 (Cupronickel)
Year	Mint	Mintage	Comments
1860	(P)	20,566,000	
1860	(P)	1,000	Proof
1861	(P)	10,100,000	
1861	(P)	1,000	Proof
1862	(P)	28,075,000	
1862	(P)	550	Proof
1863	(P)	49,840,000	
1863	(P)	460	Proof
1864	(P)	13,740,000	
1864	(P)	370	Proof

=== Bronze Indian cent ===
Shield on reverse, 1864–1909 (Bronze)
Year	Mint	Mintage	Comments
1864	(P)	39,233,714	
1864	(P)	^	L on ribbon
1864	(P)	150	Proof
1864	(P)	35	Proof, L on ribbon
1865	(P)	35,429,286	
1865	(P)	500	Proof
1866	(P)	9,826,500	
1866	(P)	725	Proof
1867	(P)	9,821,000	
1867	(P)	625	Proof
1868	(P)	10,266,500	
1868	(P)	600	Proof
1869	(P)	6,420,000	
1869	(P)	600	Proof
1870	(P)	5,275,000	
1870	(P)	1,000	Proof
1871	(P)	3,929,500	
1871	(P)	960	Proof
1872	(P)	4,042,000	
1872	(P)	950	Proof
1873	(P)	11,676,500	Double die variety has been found
1873	(P)	1,100	Proof
1874	(P)	14,187,500	
1874	(P)	700	Proof
1875	(P)	13,528,000	
1875	(P)	700	Proof
1876	(P)	7,944,000	
1876	(P)	1,150	Proof
1877	(P)	852,500	
1877	(P)	900	Proof
1878	(P)	5,797,500	
1878	(P)	2,350	Proof
1879	(P)	16,228,000	
1879	(P)	3,200	Proof
1880	(P)	38,961,000	
1880	(P)	3,955	Proof
1881	(P)	39,208,000	
1881	(P)	3,575	Proof
1882	(P)	38,578,000	
1882	(P)	3,100	Proof
1883	(P)	45,591,500	
1883	(P)	6,609	Proof
1884	(P)	23,257,800	
1884	(P)	3,942	Proof
1885	(P)	11,761,594	
1885	(P)	3,790	Proof
1886	(P)	17,650,000	
1886	(P)	4,290	Proof
1887	(P)	45,223,523	
1887	(P)	2,960	Proof
1888	(P)	37,489,832	
1888	(P)	4,582	Proof
1889	(P)	48,866,025	
1889	(P)	3,336	Proof
1890	(P)	57,180,114	
1890	(P)	2,740	Proof
1891	(P)	47,070,000	
1891	(P)	2,350	Proof
1892	(P)	37,647,087	
1892	(P)	2,745	Proof
1893	(P)	46,640,000	
1893	(P)	2,195	Proof
1894	(P)	16,749,500	
1894	(P)	2,632	Proof
1895	(P)	38,341,474	
1895	(P)	2,062	Proof
1896	(P)	39,055,431	
1896	(P)	1,862	Proof
1897	(P)	50,464,392	
1897	(P)	1,938	Proof
1898	(P)	49,821,284	
1898	(P)	1,795	Proof
1899	(P)	53,598,000	
1899	(P)	2,031	Proof
1900	(P)	66,831,502	
1900	(P)	2,262	Proof
1901	(P)	79,609,158	
1901	(P)	1,985	Proof
1902	(P)	87,374,704	
1902	(P)	2,018	Proof
1903	(P)	85,092,703	
1903	(P)	1,790	Proof
1904	(P)	61,326,198	
1904	(P)	1,817	Proof
1905	(P)	80,717,011	
1905	(P)	2,152	Proof
1906	(P)	96,020,530	
1906	(P)	1,725	Proof
1907	(P)	108,137,143	
1907	(P)	1,475	Proof
1908	(P)	32,326,317	
1908	S	1,115,000	First time San Francisco produced the cent
1908	(P)	1,620	Proof
1909	(P)	14,368,470	
1909	S	309,000	
1909	(P)	2,175	Proof

== See also ==
- Cent (United States coin)
- Wheat cent
- 1943 steel cent
- 1955 doubled die cent
- 1974 aluminum cent
- Lincoln cent mintage figures
- United States nickel mintage figures
- Roosevelt dime mintage figures
- United States quarter mintage figures
  - 50 State quarter mintage figures
  - America the Beautiful quarter mintage figures
  - American Women quarters
- United States half dollar mintage figures
  - Kennedy half dollar mintage figures
- American Silver Eagle mintage figures
