= Laurenzana =

- Comune
- Comune di Laurenzana
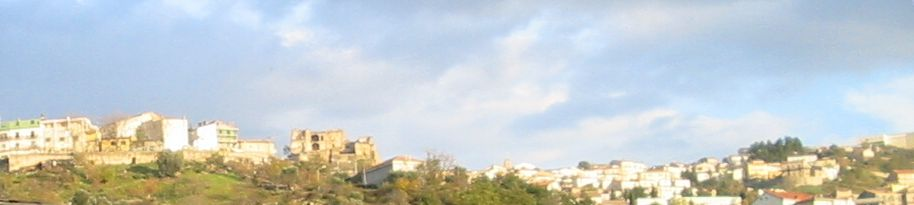

- Coat of arms

- Location within Italy Location within Basilicata
- Coordinates: 40°27′35″N 15°58′15″E
- Country: Italy
- Region: Basilicata
- Province: Potenza (PZ)

Government
  - Mayor: Michele Ungaro

Area
  - Total: 95 km^{2} (37 sq mi)

Population (1996)
  - Total: 2,246
  - Density: 24/km^{2} (61/sq mi)
- Demonym: Laurenzanesi
- Time zone: UTC+1 (CET)
  - Summer (DST): UTC+2 (CEST)
- Postal code: 85014
- Dialing code: 0971
- ISTAT code: 076041
- Patron saint: Beato Egidio; Madonna del Carmine
- Saint day: Last Sunday of May
- Website: Official website

Laurenzana (Lucano: Laurenzànë) is a town and comune in the province of Potenza, in the region of Basilicata (southern Italy). It rises on a spur between the torre Camastro and the wood surrounding the Serrapotamo valley.

== History ==
Laurenzana's origins probably date from the 12th century when the Normans decided to build a fortified village in this area due to its strategic position. In 1268 Laurenzana took part in the Ghibelline revolt against Pope Clement IV. During the Aragonese domination, it was ruled by the Orsini del Balzo and then in the 15th century by the Loffredos followed by the Filangieris the De Ruggieros, the De Quartos and the Belgioiosos.

== Main sights ==
The ruins of the 12th to 13th-century Laurenzana Castle are found on a crag atop the village.

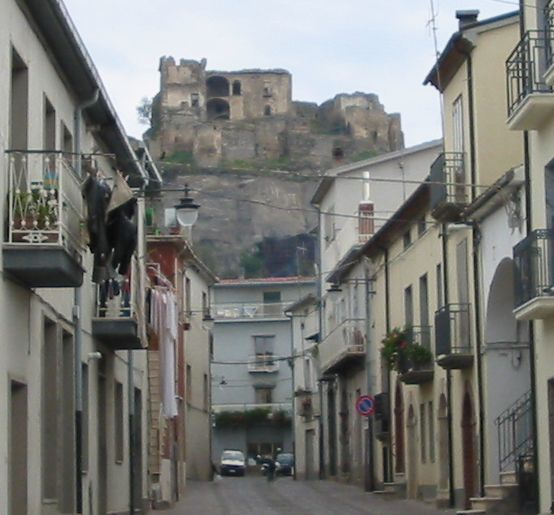
Laurenzana Castle Ruins

The Chiesa Madre dell'Assunta with a stone portal dating from 1780 is the main church. It has a polychrome marble main altar, and a 16th-century fresco along with 18th-century Neapolitan school altarpieces.

Near the Assunta there is a belvedere from which it is possible to view the surrounding valleys and mountains. Near town is a trail in the Abetina ("Fir-wood") of Laurenzana, covering an area of 8 square kilometres (3.1 mi^{2}) on which silver firs and beech trees grow. The Società Botanica Italiana has considered the Abetina as a biotope of extraordinary environmental interest and has designated it a "Riserva Naturale Regionale".

The Church of the Madonna del Carmine houses a 1611 canvas painted by Giovanni Battista Serra from Tricarico.

== Economy ==
Up to a few years ago, Laurenzana was famous for the production of high quality liquors produced in four distilleries situated within the village. Handicraft activities regarding the manufacture of wooden barrels, bagpipes and wrought-iron were also widespread. The economy of the village is mainly based on agriculture; in fact, it is possible to find silviculture and animal breeding farms producing delicious dairy products.

== Religious festivals ==
- Beato Egidio da Laurenzana: January 10 (date of birth); Last Sunday in May or First Sunday in June
- Sant'Antonio di Padova: June 13
- San Vito: June 15
- Madonna del Carmelo: July 16
- San Rocco: August 16
- Madonna Addolorata: Last Sunday in September

== Typical local dishes ==
- Calzone ripieno con salame. (Calzone filled with salame)
- Gnocchi con le rape. (Gnocchi with turnips)
- Pane di grano duro cotto al forno (Durum wheat bread cooked in an oven)
- Sauzezz r laurnzn (Traditional sausages)
- Patate chiene (Filled potatoes)
- Nuglia (Lean sausages)

== Demographic ==
Population census

== Twin towns ==
- Barberino di Mugello, Italy

== See also ==
- Gaetani dell'Aquila d'Aragona, princes of Piedimonte, and dukes of Laurenzana
- Teresa de Francisci, born Maria "Mary" Teresa Cafarelli; is best known for being the model for the depiction of Liberty on the obverse of the Peace Dollar, which was designed by her husband Anthony de Francisci.
