= Clinton High School (Massachusetts) =

School in Massachusetts, United States

Coordinates: 42.4103°N 71.7038°W

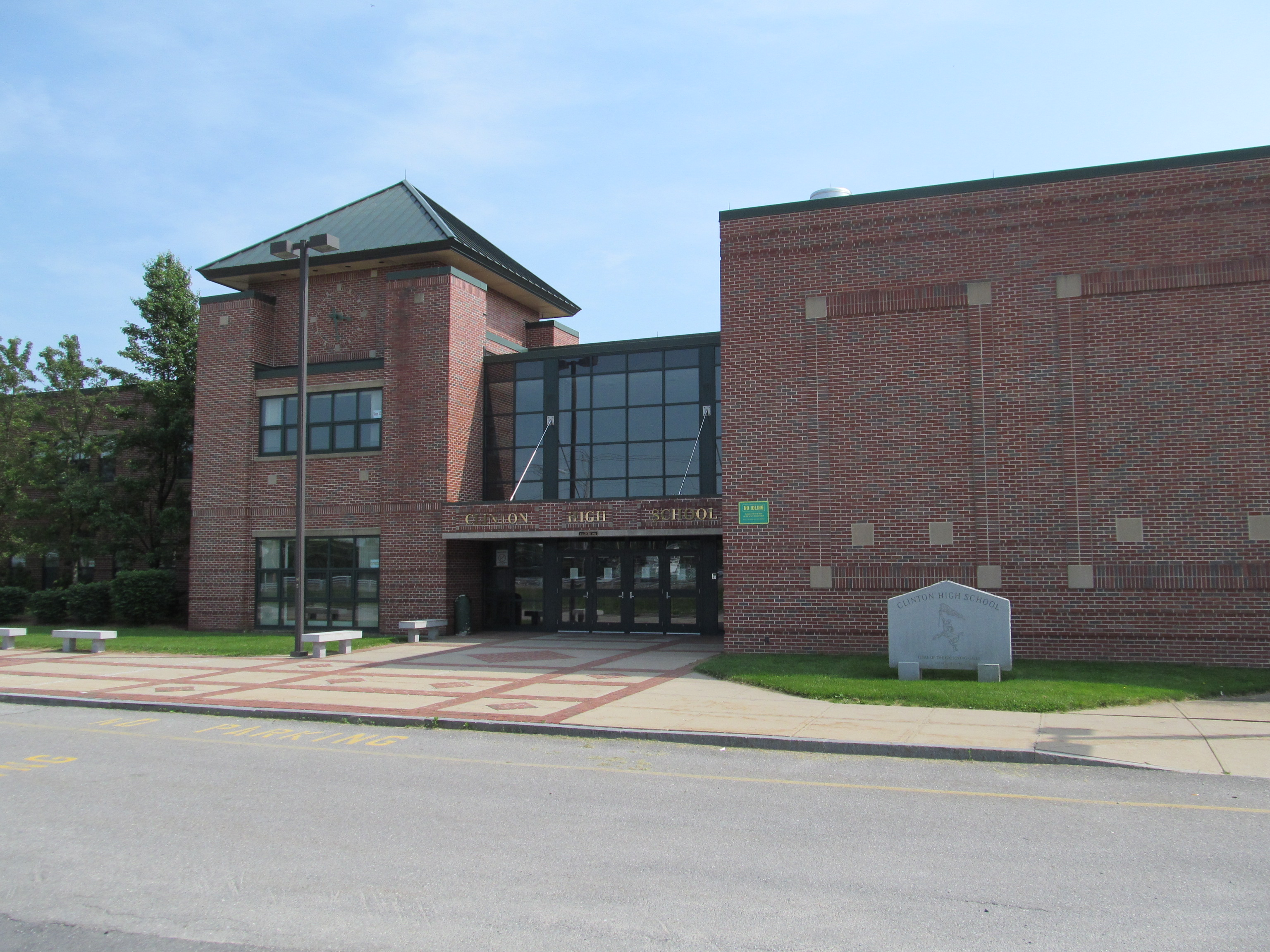

Location
- 200 West Boylston Street; Clinton, Worcester County, MA 01510; United States

Information
- School type: Public; Open enrollment
- School district: Clinton Public Schools
- Principal: Scott Czermak
- Teaching staff: 48.90 (FTE)
- Grades: PK, 9-12
- Enrollment: 581 (2023–2024)
- Student to teacher ratio: 11.88
- Hours in school day: 6 hours, 40 minutes
- Colours: Green & Gold
- Athletics conference: Midland Wachusett League
- Mascot: Gael
- Team name: Galloping Gaels
- Rival: Nashoba Wolves

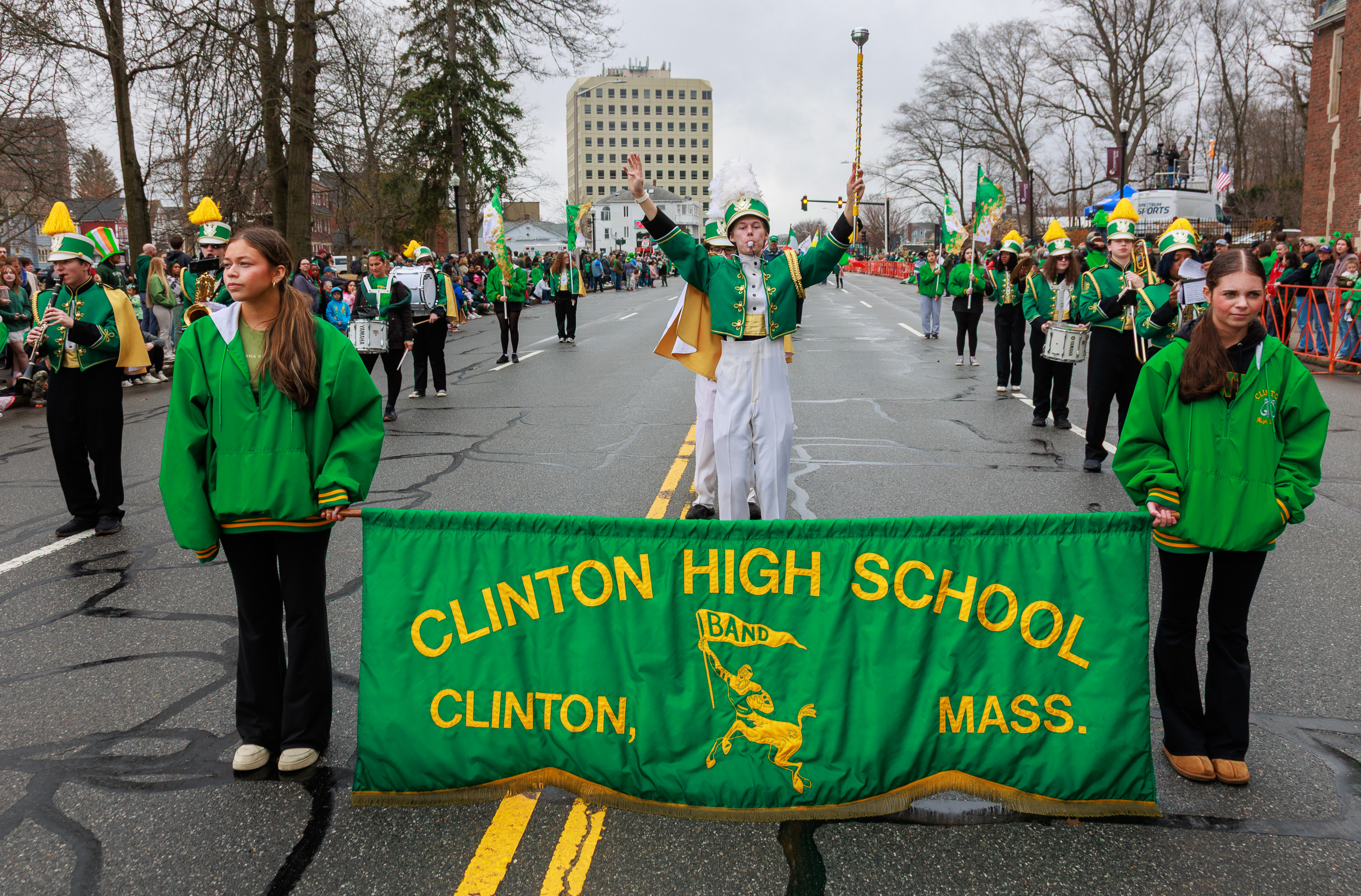
The Clinton High School Band at Worcester's St. Patrick's Day Parade

Clinton Senior High School, is a secondary school located at 200 West Boylston St., in Clinton, Massachusetts, United States.

== Performing Arts ==
=== Drama Club ===
The drama club entered a number of productions into the TAMY Awards through Theatre at the Mount. The club has received the following awards and recognition:

- 2006-2007 Best Supporting Actor (Brett Rochford as Barnaby in Hello Dolly)
- 2006-2007 Best Male Cameo Performance (Brian West as Rudolph in Hello Dolly)
- 2006-2007 Best Lobby Display (Hello Dolly)
- 2006-2007 Outstanding Student Set Design (Brett Rochford for Hello Dolly)
- 2006-2007 Not Your Average Chorus Member (Sarah Freel for Hello Dolly)
- 2007-2008 Not Your Average Chorus Member (Brett Rochford for Damn Yankees)
- 2007-2008 Best Lobby Display (Damn Yankees)
- 2007-2008 Outstanding Student Set Design (Brett Rochford for Damn Yankees)
- 2008-2009 Best Lobby Display (Guys and Dolls)
- 2008-2009 Outstanding Student Set Design (Brett Rochford for Guys and Dolls)

=== Band ===
In October 2022, band director Daniel Francois took the band students to a performance of the Marine Corps Band at Mechanics Hall. The following day, the Marine Band Outreach Program held an hour-long Music Master Class for the students.

== Notable alumni ==
- David I. Walsh, elected governor of Massachusetts in 1913. Elected to the U.S. Senate in 1918. Alumnus of the CHS Class of 1890.
- Philip J. Philbin, elected to the U.S. Congress in 1934. At the time, he was the youngest member of Congress. Alumnus of the CHS Class of 1916.
- Joseph E. Casey, served 14 terms in the U.S. Congress. Alumnus of the CHS Class of 1917.
- Sydney Schanberg, Pulitzer Prize winning reporter for his coverage of the fall of Phnom Penh. Alumnus of the CHS Class of 1951.
- Teresa de Francisci, Born Mary Teresa Cafarelli, Alumna of the CHS class of 1918. Wife of sculptor and designer of the U.S. Peace Silver Dollar, Anthony de Francisci. Mary was also the model for the obverse of the coin.
- William P. Constantino, state representative and judge. Class of 1928.
