= Honorable Service Lapel Button =

Lapel button awarded for military service

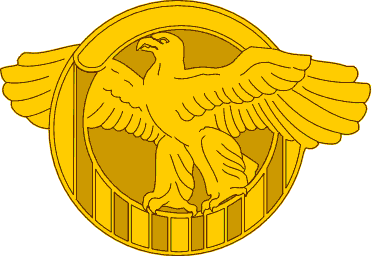
- 1939–1946
- Type: Lapel button
- Awarded for: honorable Federal military service between June 9, 1925 and December 31, 1946.
- Country: United States
- Presented by: Secretary of War; Secretary of the Navy
- Status: Obsolete
- Established: General Orders 13, War Department, June 9, 1925
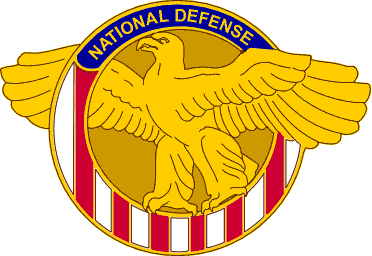
- 1925–1939

The Honorable Service Lapel Button, colloquially called "Ruptured Duck" by the members of the military, was a lapel button awarded for honorable Federal military service between 1925 and 1946. The award, designed by Anthony de Francisci, was issued for wear on the left lapel of civilian clothing upon discharge.

The U.S. departments of War and the Navy issued the lapel button to eligible servicemen and women upon discharge. It was made of gilt brass, except during metal shortages during which it was made of gilt plastic. Service members who received the plastic version were later allowed to trade it in for the brass version.

== Appearance ==
The button is approximately 7/16 inch in height and 5/8 inch in width. A cloth lozenge depicting the gold colored button design was also issued. The lozenge was approximately 1.5 inches in height and 3 inches in width with the ring design being approximately 1 inch in diameter. Honorably discharged veterans wore the lapel pin on the left lapel of civilian clothing and the lozenge was sewn onto the right breast of the dress uniform that they wore when being discharged.

Even though it depicts an eagle, the design of the eagle seems to depict its breast bursting through the button as though it has ruptured, and the eagle was believed by some to have been so poorly designed as to resemble a duck rather than an eagle. The term "ruptured duck" was coined to refer to it on that basis.

== Honorable Discharge Emblem ==
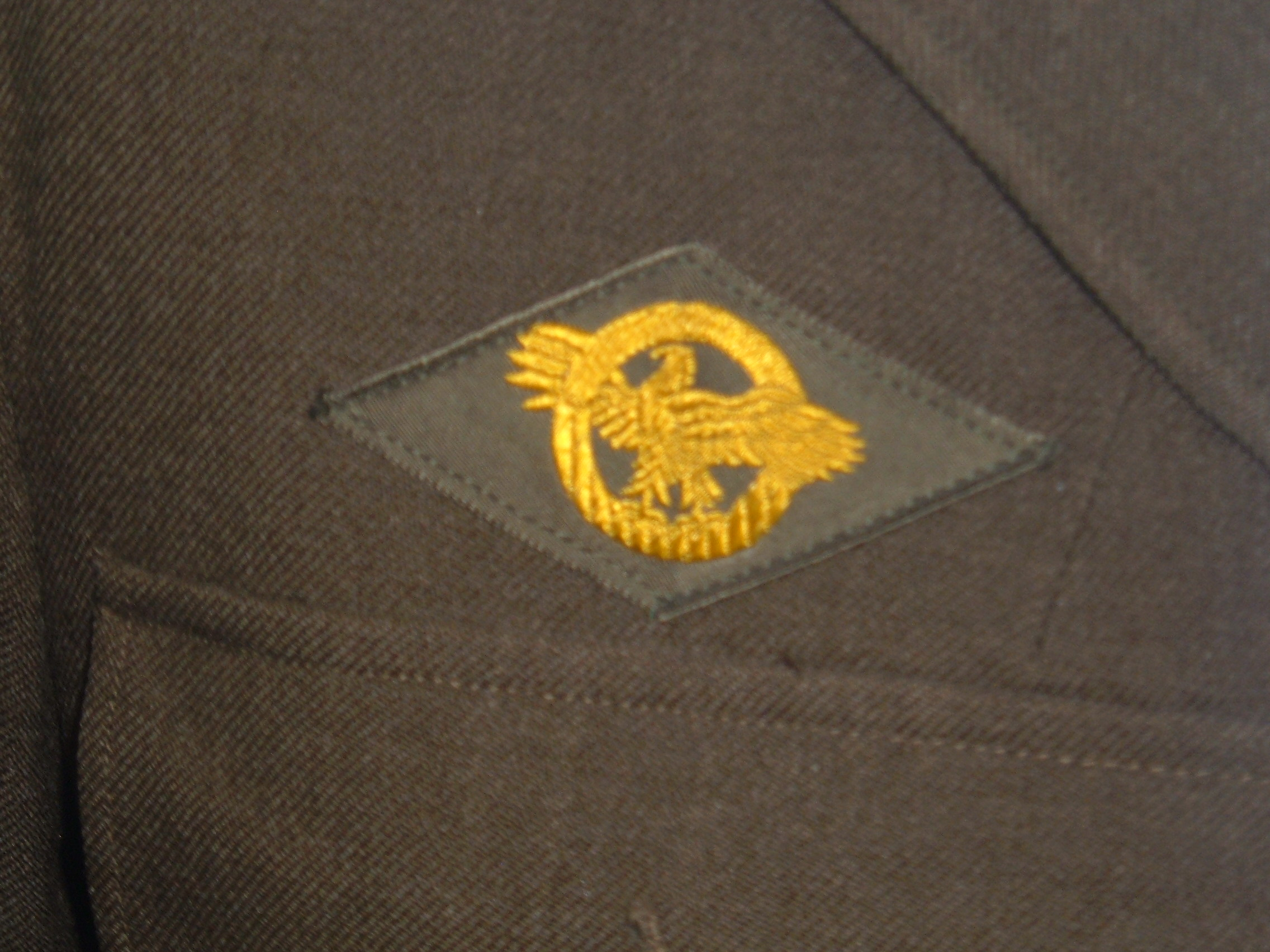
In November 1944, the Honorable Discharge Emblem was established for wear over the right uniform pocket of all returning World War II personnel.

The Honorable Discharge Emblem, designed to be worn on the military uniform, served as proof the wearer was an honorably discharged veteran returning from service during World War II. It was unofficially utilized as an identifier to railroad, bus, and other transportation companies who offered free or subsidized transportation to returning veterans.

During World War II, enlisted members of the armed forces were forbidden to possess civilian clothing unless they were under specific orders to do so. This not only made desertion more difficult, but also ensured that any captured service member would be treated as a prisoner of war under the rules of war. (Soldiers captured in combat zones in possession of civilian clothing were liable to be treated as spies and summarily executed.) In pre-war conditions, discharged veterans typically donned civilian clothing when returning home, but this was logistically difficult during wartime and immediate post-war America. Approximately 16 million men and women served in the uniformed services during the crisis, most of whom were scheduled to be discharged within a short period of time during the general demobilization at the end of the war. Clothing was already in short supply due to cloth rationing, and the immediate clothing needs of millions of returning veterans threatened to crash an already overtaxed system. The Honorable Discharge Emblem, embroidered onto a cloth lozenge and sewn over the right pocket of the military uniform, allowed the veteran to continue to wear the uniform for up to 90 days subsequent to discharge.

== Legacy ==
World War II veterans wore the Honorable Service Lapel Button on the left lapel of civilian clothing many years after the war. It also appeared on a U.S. postage stamp honoring World War II veterans and was widely used as a popular symbol of their service. Usage of the term "ruptured duck" later expanded to refer to servicemen wearing the emblem, as in "that ruptured duck is flying space-available." The term later came into use to describe someone or something moving quickly, presumably because returning servicemen were usually in a great hurry to return to their homes in the United States.

== See also ==
- List of participating aircraft in Doolittle Raid — "The Ruptured Duck"
