= VAM (Morgan and Peace dollar die varieties) =

Peace and Morgan dollar die variety

A VAM is a study of the differences in dies which were used to strike United States Morgan dollar and Peace dollar coins. The acronym "VAM" is taken from the last name of the two people who studied and cataloged the die differences: Leroy Van Allen and A. George Mallis. As a result of VAM studies, a wide assortment of varieties for the two series of coins have been discovered and catalogued.

== Background ==
Coin collectors were aware of Morgan dollar varieties and differences which were caused by dies. The VAM coins are different than Mint-made errors which are mistakes or defective coins. A VAM occurs as a result of a die variety which creates the same variation on a number of coins. The discovery and cataloging of VAM dollars is concerned with small differences in coins. Leroy Van Allen (VA) and A. George Mallis (M) documented the small variations and VAM comes from the initials of their last names.

== History ==
There are in more than 3,000 different VAMs however the coin certification company Professional Coin Grading Service (PCGS) does not recognize all of them. They recognize 52 VAM Peace dollars and 317 Morgan dollar VAMs. A VAM can be a small change in dies like a different sized mint mark, or something more dramatic like a repunched date.
