= Laurenzana Castle =

Castello di Laurenzana
- Southern Italy
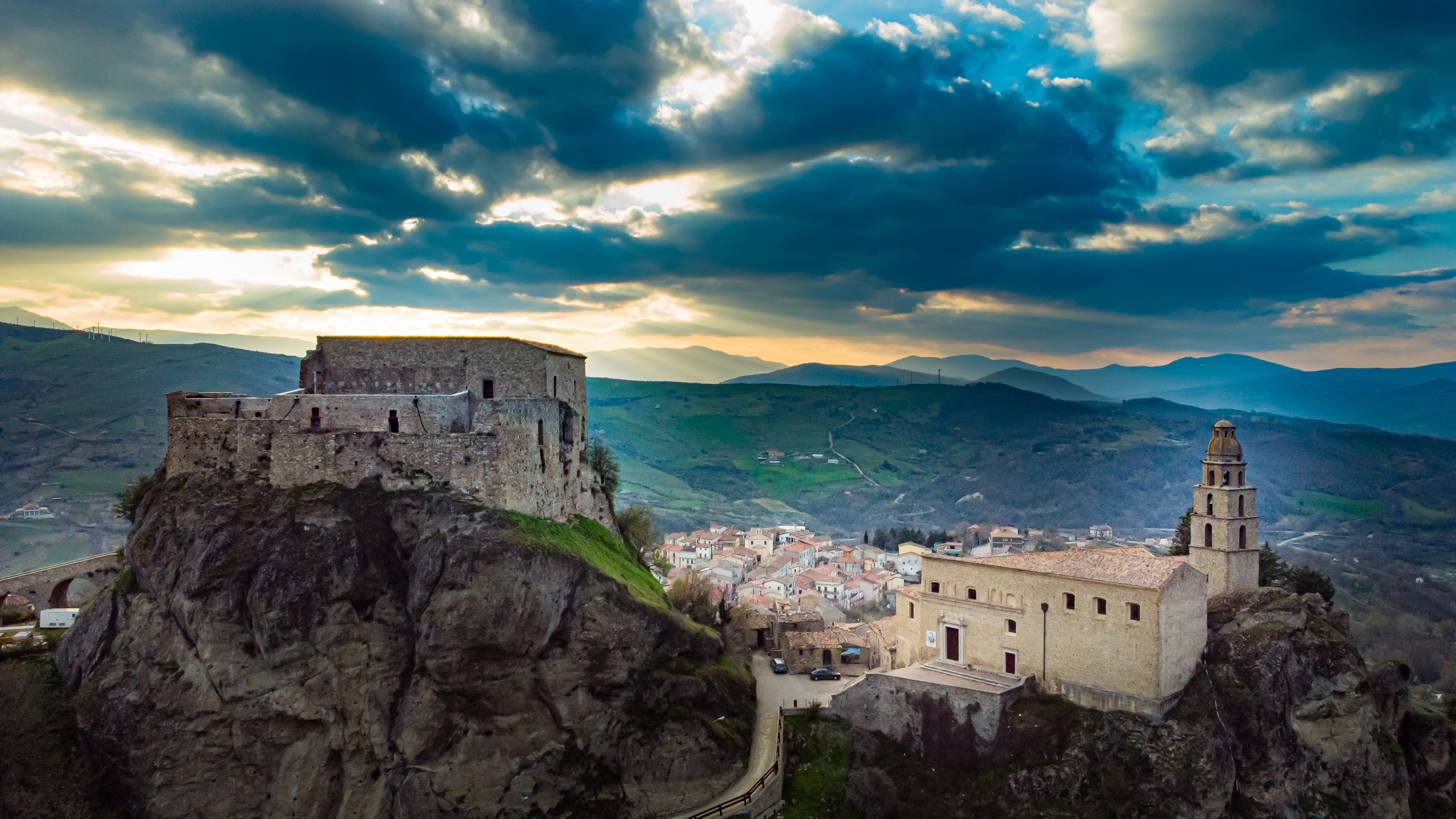

Site information
- Condition: Dilapidated

Location
- Coordinates: 40.4607°N 15.9729°E

Site history
- Built: 12-13th century

Laurenzana Castle (Italian: Castello di Laurenzana) is a former 12th-13th-century castle, now in dilapidated state, standing on a rocky outcrop above the town of Laurenzana in the Basilicata region of Italy.

== History ==
The outline of the castle today was built by feudatories of the Norman ruler, Guglielmo, in 1150, who built atop a Lombard fortress. The castle was ceded to make a hermitage for Basilian monks. For a time, it was occupied by Muslim forces from Africa. By the middle of the 13th century, the castle was occupied by the Swabian rulers, then the Angevins, then Aragonese. After 1454, it became feudal property of a series of families. In 1483, the owner, Raimondo Orsini Del Balzo, began converting it into a residence. Such work continued in 1606 under Gaetani D'Aragona It then passed to the families of the Dukes of Belgioioso, who owned it till the early 1800s.

== See also ==
- Belgioioso Castle
