= Teresa de Francisci =

American model for Liberty (1898–1990)

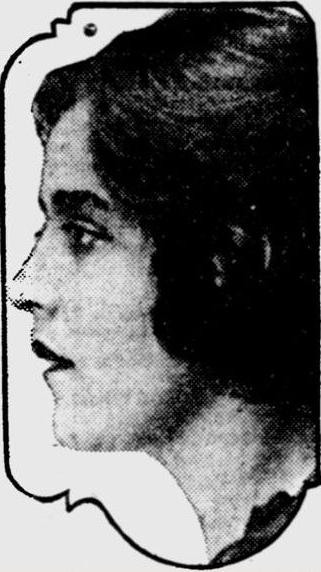
- Teresa de Francisci
- Born: Maria Teresa Cafarelli; May 4, 1898; Laurenzana, Potenza (PZ), Basilicata, Italy
- Died: October 20, 1990 (aged 92); Manhattan, New York, US
- Known for: Model for the depiction of Liberty on the Peace Dollar

Teresa Cafarelli de Francisci (May 4, 1898 – October 20, 1990) was an American woman who is best known for being the model for the depiction of Liberty on the obverse of the Peace Dollar, which was designed by her husband Anthony de Francisci.

== Personal life ==
De Francisci was born Maria "Mary" Teresa Cafarelli in Laurenzana, a town in the Basilicata region of Italy, to Donatantonio "Donato" and Rosagnese "Rosa" Emma. When she was four years old, she and her mother emigrated to the United States. She was raised in Clinton, Massachusetts, graduating from Clinton High School in 1918. De Francisci was the first person of Italian descent to graduate the school. She married Anthony de Francisci in 1920. Anthony de Francisci died on August 20, 1964. Teresa de Francisci died 26 years later, on October 20, 1990, at the age of 92.

== Peace dollar model ==
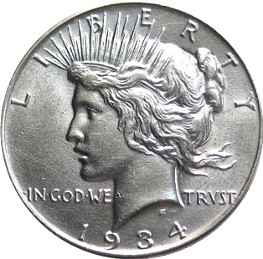
Obverse of the Peace dollar

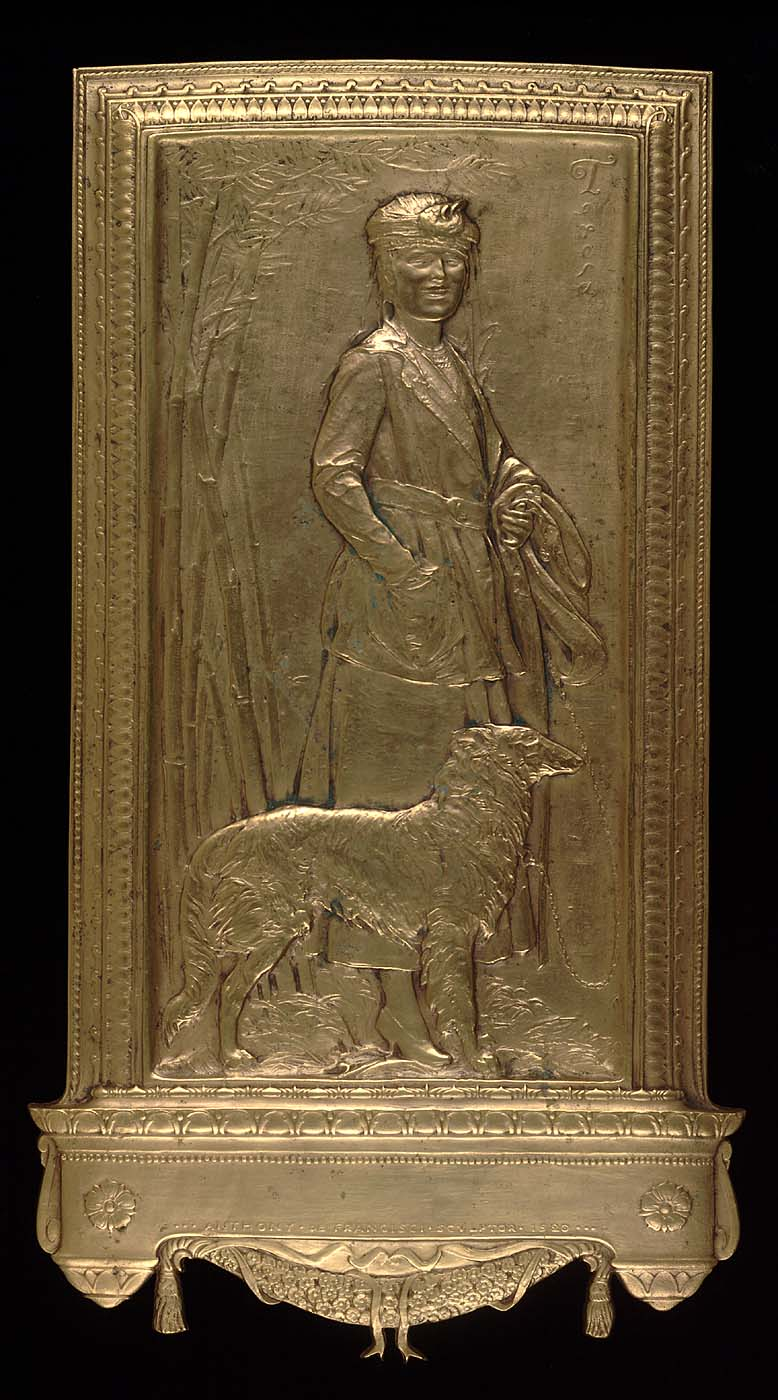
Bas relief depicting Teresa de Francisci, created by Anthony de Francisci in 1920

In 1921, the United States Commission of Fine Arts held a contest in order to determine who would design the new silver dollar that was to be issued as a commemorative of peace. The coin was slated to go into production later that year. Eight sculptors were invited to take part. The artists invited were Chester Beach, Victor David Brenner, Anthony de Francisci, John Flanagan, Henry Hering, Hermon Atkins MacNeil and Adolph Alexander Weinman. De Francisci's design was eventually chosen. As winner of the contest, de Francisci was awarded $1,500; the other seven participants were awarded $100 for their entries.

Due to time constraints, de Francisci was unable to schedule a professional model to pose for the obverse depiction of Liberty. Instead, he opted to model his depiction of Liberty on his wife. In describing his technique, he stated "I opened a window of my studio and let the wind blow on her hair while she was posing for me." The sculptor later stated that though his wife was the model for the coin, it did not depict a perfect likeness. In remarks published by the Minneapolis Tribune in 1922, de Francisci states that "the Liberty is not a photograph of Mrs. de Francisci. It is a composite face and in that way typifies something of America." The Peace dollar officially went into production on December 29, 1921. The coin was minted yearly from 1921 to 1928, and again in 1934 and 1935.

== Bibliography ==
Van Allen, Leroy C. & Mallis, A. George (1991). Comprehensive Catalog and Encyclopedia of Morgan & Peace Dollars. Virginia Beach, Virginia: DLRC Press. ISBN 1-880731-11-8.
