= Anthony de Francisci =

Italian-American sculptor

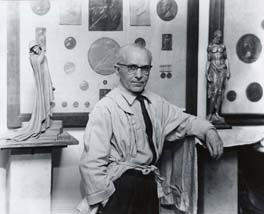
- De Francisci in his studio
- Born: Antonio de Francisci; July 13, 1887; Palermo, Sicily, Italy
- Died: August 20, 1964 (aged 77); Manhattan, New York City, U.S.
- Known for: Sculpting
- Notable work: Peace dollar
- Patrons: United States Mint

Anthony (Antonio) de Francisci (Italian pronunciation: [de franˈtʃiʃʃi]; July 13, 1887 – August 20, 1964) was an Italian-American sculptor who designed a number of United States coins and medals. His most famous design was the Peace Dollar, which was first minted in 1921.

== Early life and training ==
De Francisci immigrated to the United States in 1905 and became a naturalized citizen of the United States in 1913. He was the son of Benedetto de Francisci and Maria Liberante and was married to Mary Teresa Cafarelli. His father was a marble cutter. De Francisci "studied under some very fine coin designers: Fraser, MacNeil, and Weinman."

== Career ==
De Francisci served as an Academician of the National Academy of Design and a Fellow of the National Sculpture Society.

== Works ==
=== Peace Dollar ===
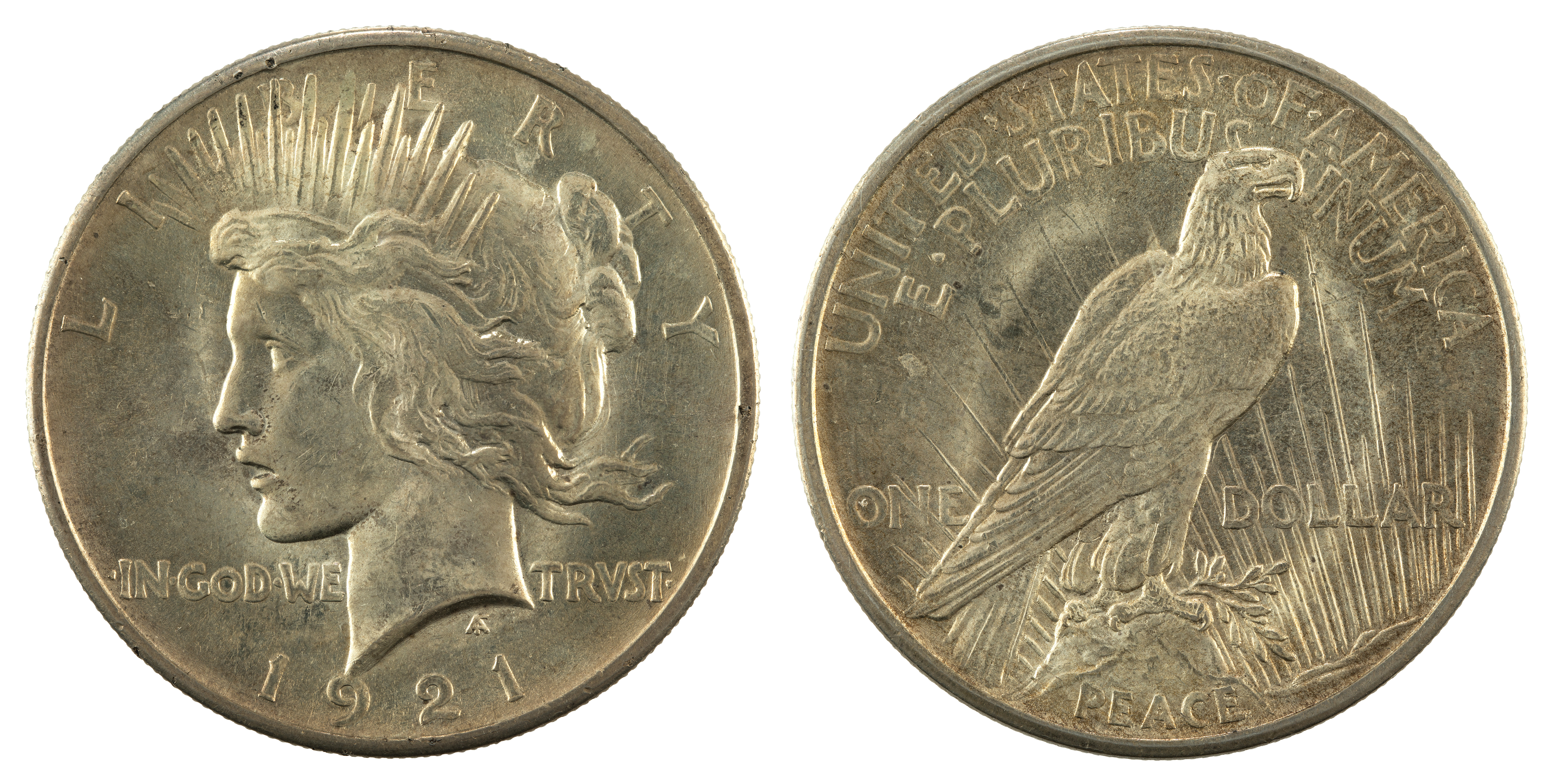
The Peace dollar, first minted in 1921

National Guard Bureau insignia designed by de Francisci, 1921

Late in 1921, the Commission of Fine Arts held a competition for the design of a new silver dollar and invited "eight prominent sculptors to participate." Several of the entrants had already designed U.S. coins and achieved considerable fame. Although the youngest participant and a novice coin designer, de Francisci "won the competition and took home the $1,500 cash prize." Regarding this event, "The Dec. 20, 1920, issue of the Baltimore Sun reported…'Eight medalists, all of them from New York, were in the competition for the award. The designs in bas-relief were exhibited privately in the office of [Mint Director Raymond T. Baker], after he had shown the winning one to President Harding. The President expressed his pleasure and approval.'" Becoming the designer of the Peace Dollar and receiving considerable publicity as a result of this accomplishment greatly boosted the reputation of de Francisci, taking his career to a whole new level.

De Francisci used his wife Mary Teresa as the model for the Liberty head of the Peace Dollar. When asked about its design, de Francisci "told a newspaper columnist that the portrait was not a 'photograph' of Mrs. de Francisci but was a 'composite' face that 'typified something of America'" De Francisci also said about the design of the Peace Dollar "that his goal was to capture the spirit of the country--its intellectual speed, vigor and vitality."

=== Other works ===
De Francisci sculpted the commemorative 1920 Maine Centennial half dollar. Also, de Francisci designed the World War II Honorable Service Lapel Button, unofficially known as the "ruptured duck." The button was intended for wear as a lapel pin on civilian clothing to recognize military service. However, the military did not issue the button. Instead, it was available by private purchase.

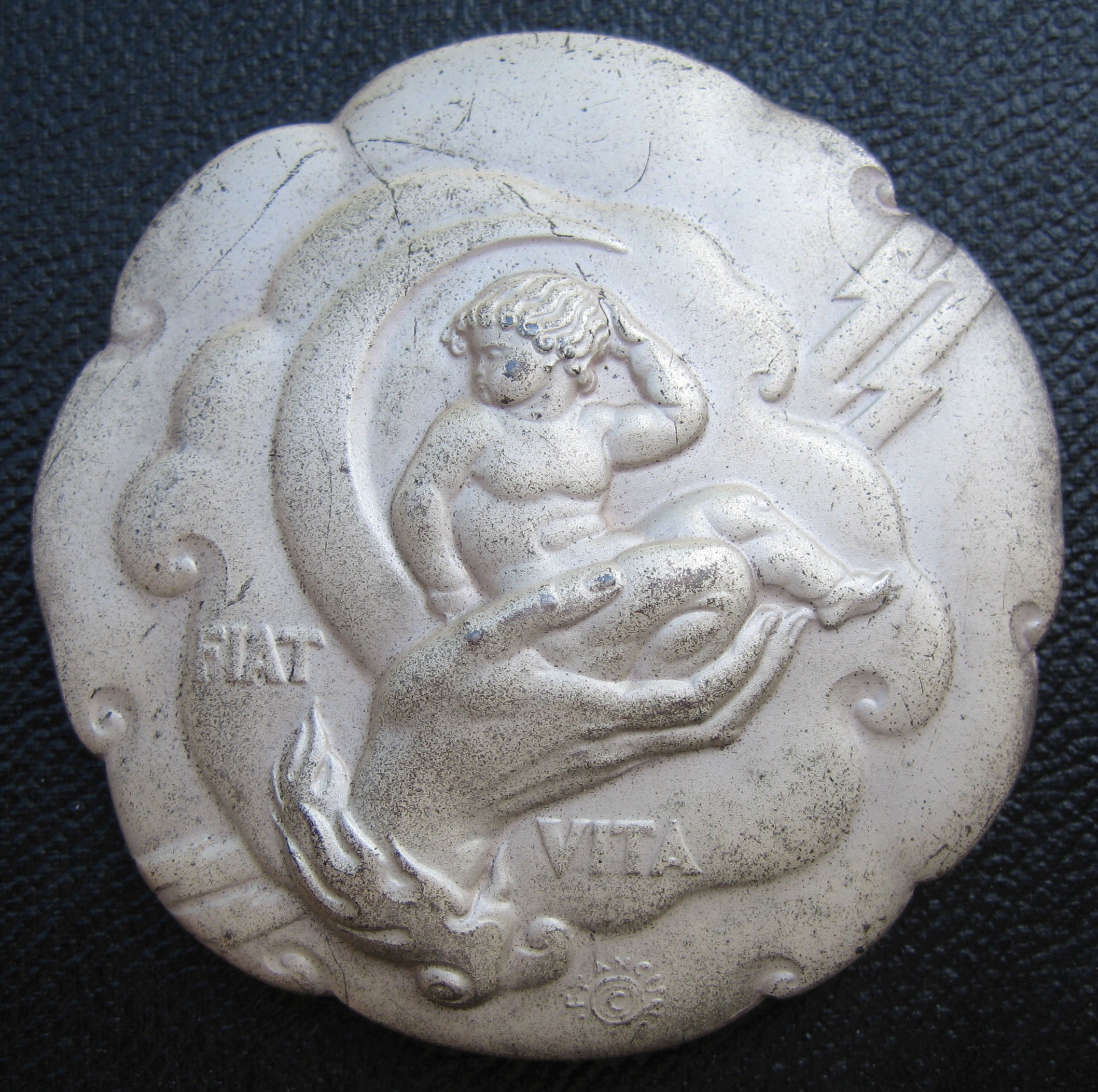
Medal (Obverse) for The Society of Medalists designed by de Francisci, 1935

Medal (Reverse) for The Society of Medalists designed by de Francisci, 1935

He modelled the bronze high reliefs of the drum base of the Sesquicentennial flagpole erected in Union Square, New York, in 1924 and dedicated, July 4, 1926, to mark the 150th anniversary of the signing of the Declaration of Independence. The architect for the project was Perry Coke Smith. Starting from the rear, the effects of liberty, rendered as the march of progress in the arts, crafts and sciences of civilization is represented by figures that move towards the Declaration of Independence reproduced on a tablet at front center, while on the right, the effects of tyranny, in which fleeing humanity avidly reach for it.

== Selected works ==
Name	Date	Notes
Adolph Alexander Weinman Portrait Plaque	1915	De Francisci made this tribute to his mentor Weinman
Maine Centennial commemorative Half Dollar	1920	
National Guard Bureau Insignia	1921	for Department of Defense
Peace Dollar	1921	
Alessandro L. Chiostergi Portrait Plaque	1922	
James Douglas Gold Medal	1922 (abt.)	For American Institute of Mining, Metallurgical, and Petroleum Engineers
American Eagle Pin	1922 (abt.)	
Texas Cavalry Medal	1924	
12th issue, Fiat Vita	1935	The Society of Medalists series
Honorable Service Lapel Button	1939	
Congressional Gold Medal to George C. Marshall	1946	
Congressional Gold Medal to General Pershing	1946	
Inaugural medal for the 1964/1965 New York World's Fair	1964	
Texas Ranger Congressional Medal		
Lincoln Medal	1963	Hall of Fame for Great Americans medal series
Cooper Medal	1964	Hall of Fame for Great Americans medal series
Alfred P. Sloan Radio-TV Award		Award for distinguished public service in highway safety

== Later life ==
De Francisci was buried at Saint Raymond's Cemetery in the Bronx, New York.

== Awards ==
- Saltus Award, 1927
- Lindsey Morris award, 1932
- Widener Gold Medal, 1938
