= Wheatie =

Wheatie may refer to:

- Wheaties cereal
- Lincoln cent#Wheat cent (1909–1958)
