= Indian Head cent =

American one-cent coin (1859–1909)

- United States
- Value: 1 cent (0.01 US dollars)
- Mass: (1859–1864) 4.67 g, (1864–1909) 3.11 g
- Diameter: 19.05 mm (0.750 in)
- Edge: Plain
- Composition: (1859–1864) 88% copper, 12% nickel (1864–1909) 95% copper, 5% tin and zinc
- Years of minting: 1858 (patterns only); 1859–1909 (regular issues)
- Mint marks: S. Located below the wreath on the reverse. Philadelphia Mint specimens struck without mint mark.

Obverse
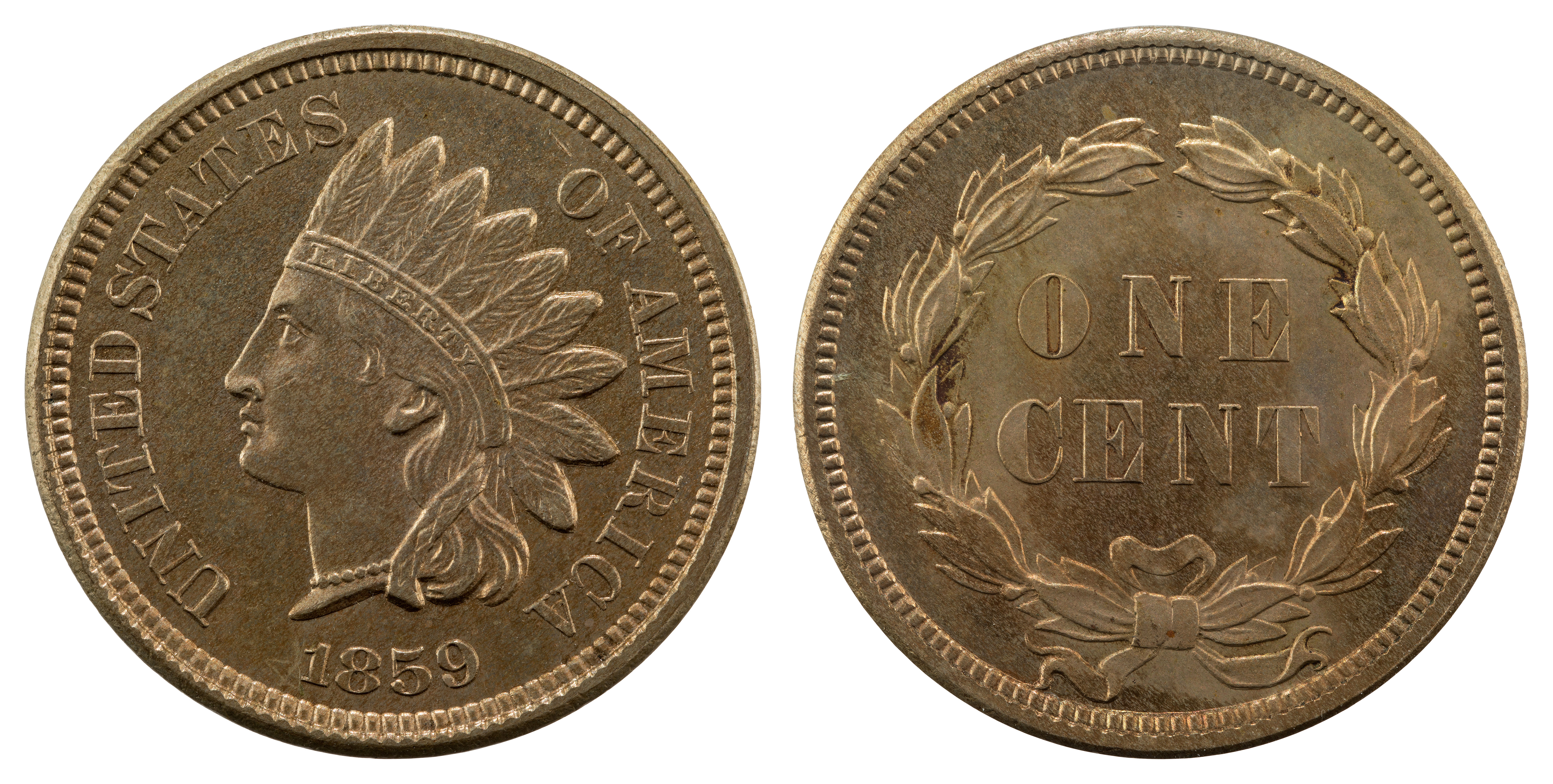
- Design: Liberty with head dress.
- Designer: James B. Longacre
- Design date: 1858

Reverse
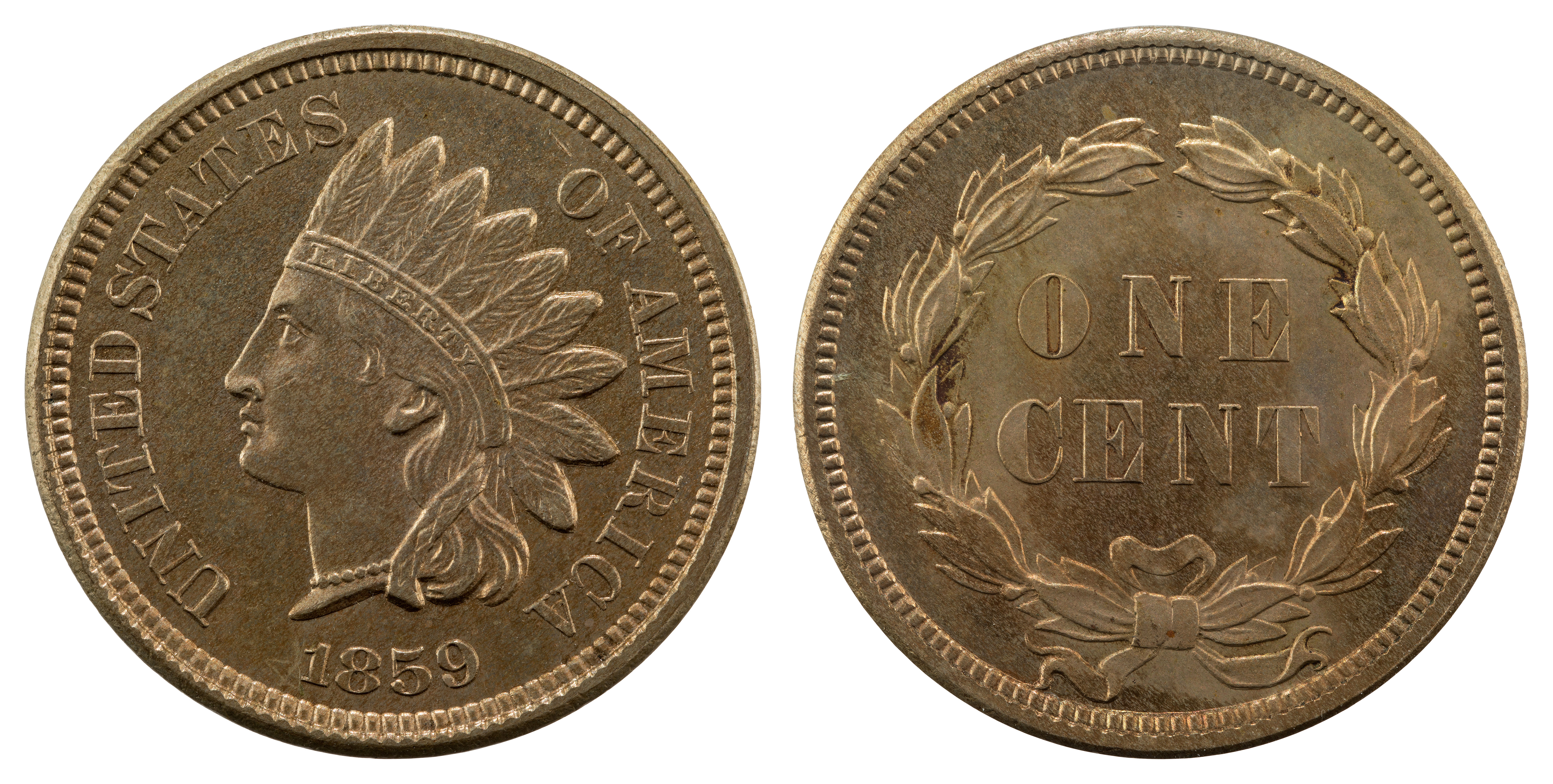
- Design: Laurel wreath
- Designer: James B. Longacre
- Design date: 1858
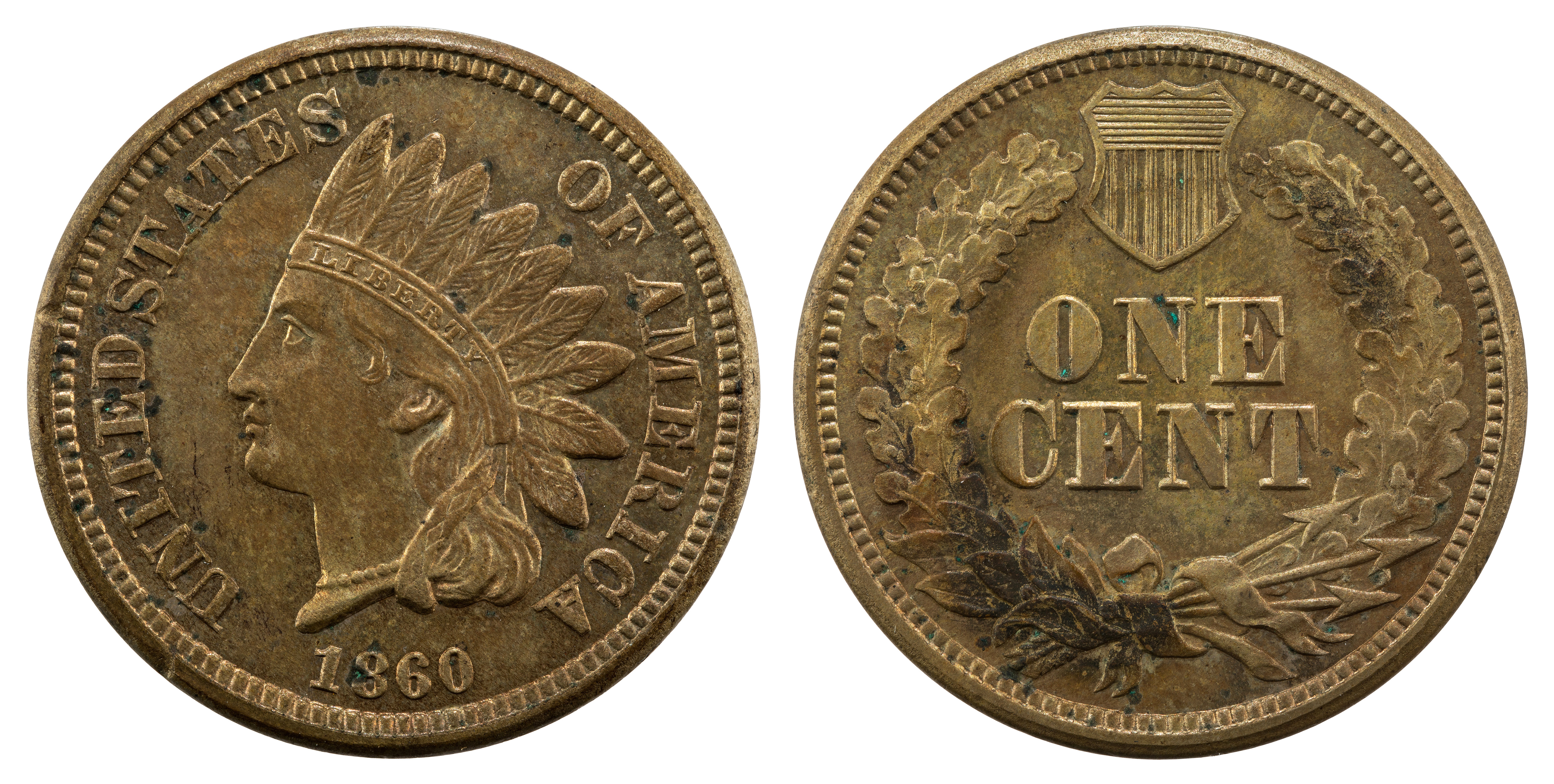
- Design: Oak wreath and shield
- Designer: James B. Longacre
- Design date: 1859

The Indian Head cent was a one-cent coin ($0.01) produced by the United States Bureau of the Mint from 1859 to 1909. It was designed by James Barton Longacre, the Chief Engraver at the Philadelphia Mint, and featured a personification of Liberty wearing an Eagle-feathered headdress.

From 1793 to 1857, the cent was a copper coin about the size of a half dollar. The discovery of gold in California caused a large inflation in prices. As gold became more abundant, the price of copper rose. Cent and half-cent manufacture was one of the only profit centers for the Mint and by 1850 it began looking for alternatives. In 1857, the Mint reduced the size of the cent and changed the composition to 12% nickel and 88% copper (copper-nickel), issuing a new design, the Flying Eagle cent. The new pieces were identical in diameter to modern cents, though thicker. This was the first use of copper-nickel for United States coins. The copper-nickel made them look brighter and they began to be called "White cent" or "Nicks".

In 1858, the Flying Eagle was replaced with the Indian head design. The Flying Eagle design caused production difficulties and the Mint soon looked to replace it. Mint Director James Ross Snowden selected the Indian Head design and chose a laurel wreath for the reverse, that was replaced in 1860 by an oak wreath with a shield. Cents were hoarded during the economic chaos of the American Civil War, when the metal nickel was in short supply. As Mint officials saw that privately issued bronze tokens were circulating, they induced Congress to pass the Coinage Act of 1864, authorizing a slimmer cent of bronze alloy.

In the postwar period, the cent became very popular and was struck in large numbers in most years. An exception was 1877, when a poor economy and little demand for cents created one of the rarest dates in the series. With the advent of coin-operated machines in the late 19th and early 20th centuries, even more cents were produced, reaching 100 million for the first time in 1907. In 1909, the Indian Head cent was replaced by the Lincoln cent, designed by Victor D. Brenner.

== Inception ==
The half-dollar-sized large cent was struck from 1793 to 1857. That coin was intended to contain close to a cent's worth of copper, as people expected coins to contain close to their face values in metal. Nevertheless, because of the constitutional clause making only gold and silver legal tender, the government would not accept copper cents for taxes or other payments. By the early 1850s, fluctuations in the price of copper led the Mint of the United States (Note: After 1873, called the Bureau of the Mint.) to seek alternatives, including reducing the size of the cent and experimenting with compositions other than pure copper. The result was the Flying Eagle cent, the same diameter as the later Lincoln cent but somewhat thicker and heavier, composed of 88% copper and 12% nickel. The Flying Eagle cent was struck in limited numbers as a pattern coin in 1856, then for circulation in 1857 and 1858.

The Flying Eagle cent was issued in exchange for worn Spanish colonial silver coins, which until then had circulated widely in the United States. These "small cents" were also issued in exchange for the copper coins they had replaced. By 1858, Mint authorities found the piece unsatisfactory in production. The high points on both sides of the coin (the eagle's head and the wreath) opposed each other, and it was difficult to get the design to be brought out fully in the tough copper-nickel alloy. Mint Engraver James B. Longacre, designer of the Flying Eagle cent, was instructed to develop alternative designs. He produced one, showing a slimmer eagle, which would not clash as much with the reverse wreath. Although that would have cured the production problem, the design was not liked. Mint Director James Ross Snowden suggested a head of Columbus as an obverse design, but Longacre felt the public would not approve of a historic figure on an American coin. (Note: Nevertheless, Columbus would be the first historic figure on an American coin, in 1892, with the commemorative Columbian half dollar.)

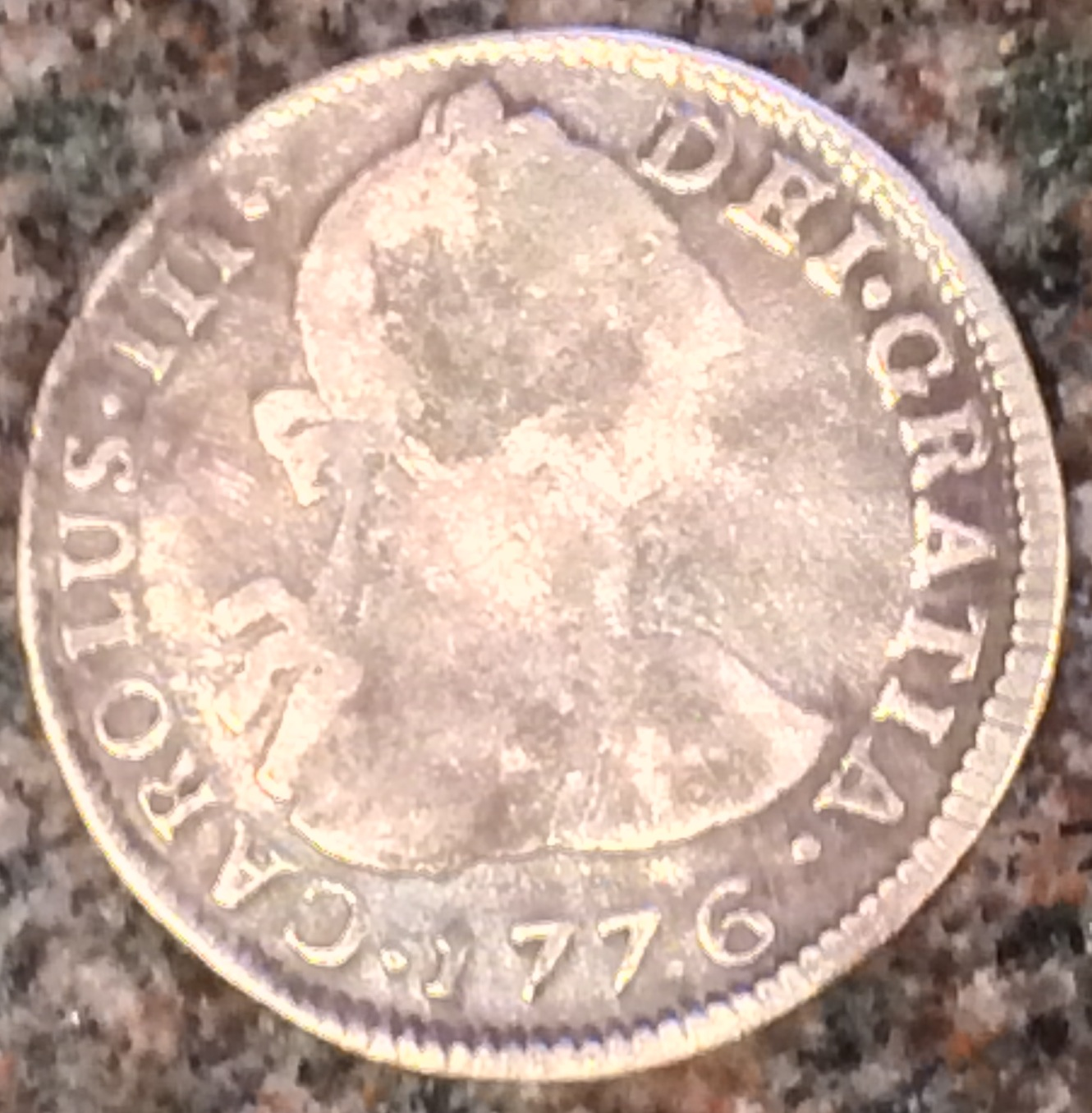
A Spanish colonial two-reales piece ("two bits") from the Potosí Mint (today in Bolivia)

In 1858, the Mint tested new designs for the cent. Between 60 and 100 sets of twelve pattern coins were struck, consisting of the standard Flying Eagle obverse, a "scrawny eagle" pattern, and the Indian Head design, mated with four different wreaths for the reverse. Snowden made his choice of what design would be struck in 1859 from those patterns, and the sets were also sold to collectors. (Note: This sale later caused Snowden difficulties. As word got around the small, scattered coin-collecting community, Snowden received a minor blizzard of requests for patterns; an exasperated Mint Director wrote to one applicant, who was seeking a range of pieces for "a friend", that he could send coins, but preferred to wait as the Mint arranged other methods of sale so that "your friend, and all other collectors of Coins, AND THEIR NAME IS LEGION, can be supplied to their heart's content". See Snow, p. 223.) The Indian Head design was apparently prepared by April, as on the twelfth of that month, a Mr. Howard wrote to Snowden that "I have learned that a new pattern piece for the cent has been struck off at the Mint [with] a head resembling that of the five dollar piece and on the reverse a shield at the top of the olive and oak wreath", and asking to purchase a specimen. Other numismatists also sought pieces: R. Coulton Davis, a Philadelphia druggist with ties to the Mint, wrote to Snowden in June informing him of a favorable story in a Boston newspaper, and Augustus B. Sage wrote to the Mint Director the same month, asking for a specimen for himself, and one for the newly founded American Numismatic Society. (Note: Snowden caused several of the patterns to be restruck. At the time, the Mint Director was seeking specimens of medals depicting George Washington to add to the Mint's coin collection, and newly struck specimens of past coins and patterns were often exchanged for them. This caused disquiet among some collectors and dealers who saw rare pieces being devalued, but Snowden made no secret of what he was doing and was undeterred. See Snow, p. 224.)

According to Walter Breen, Snowden most likely chose the combination of the Indian Head and the laurel wreath because it had the lowest relief of any of the options, and could be expected to strike well. On November 4, 1858, Snowden wrote to Treasury Secretary Howell Cobb about the Indian Head design, and two days later wrote to Longacre, informing him that it was approved. Longacre was to prepare the necessary dies for production, which was to begin on January 1, 1859.

== Design ==
Longacre advocated his Indian Head design in an August 21, 1858, letter to Snowden:

From the copper shores of Lake Superior, to the silver mountains of Potosi from the Ojibwa to the Araucanian, the feathered tiara is as characteristic of the primitive races of our hemisphere, as the turban is of the Asiatic. Nor is there anything in its decorative character, repulsive to the association of Liberty ... It is more appropriate than the Phrygian cap, the emblem rather of the emancipated slave, than of the independent freeman, of those who are able to say "we were never in bondage to any man". I regard then this emblem of America as a proper and well defined portion of our national inheritance; and having now the opportunity of consecrating it as a memorial of Liberty, 'our Liberty', American Liberty; why not use it? One more graceful can scarcely be devised. We have only to determine that it shall be appropriate, and all the world outside of us cannot wrest it from us.

By numismatic legend, the facial features of the goddess Liberty on the obverse of the Indian Head cent were based on the features of Longacre's daughter Sarah; the tale runs that she was at the mint one day when she tried on the headdress of one of a number of Native Americans who were visiting, and her father sketched her. However, Sarah Longacre was 30 years old and married in 1858, not 12 as in the tale, and Longacre himself stated that the face was based on a statue of Crouching Venus in Philadelphia on loan from the Vatican. He did often sketch his elder daughter, and there are resemblances between the depictions of Sarah and the various representations of Liberty on his coins of the 1850s. These tales were apparently extant at the time, as Snowden, writing to Treasury Secretary Howell Cobb in November 1858, denied that the coin was based "on any human features in the Longacre family". Lee F. McKenzie, in his 1991 article on Longacre, notes that any artist can be influenced by many things, but calls the story "essentially false".

Regardless of who posed for Longacre, the facial features of the "Indian" are essentially Caucasian, meaning that a Caucasian woman wears the headdress of a Native American man. Longacre had, in 1854, designed the three-dollar piece with a female with similar features (also supposedly based on the museum sculpture) but a more fanciful headdress, and adapted that design for the gold dollar. Officials were aware of this artistic license at the time of issue; Snowden, in his November 1858 letter to Cobb, characterizes the two earlier coins as "the artists at the Mint evidently not realizing the absurd incongruity of placing this most masculine attribute of the warrior brave on the head of a woman". Longacre would not be the last to juxtapose the features of a White woman with an Indian headdress reserved for men; Augustus Saint-Gaudens, for the Indian Head eagle (1907), produced a similar design. Later issues depict more accurate Indians, including Bela Lyon Pratt's Indian Head gold pieces (1908), the Buffalo nickel (1913) by James Earle Fraser, who worked from Native American models, and the Oregon Trail Memorial half dollar (1926), designed by Fraser and his wife Laura.

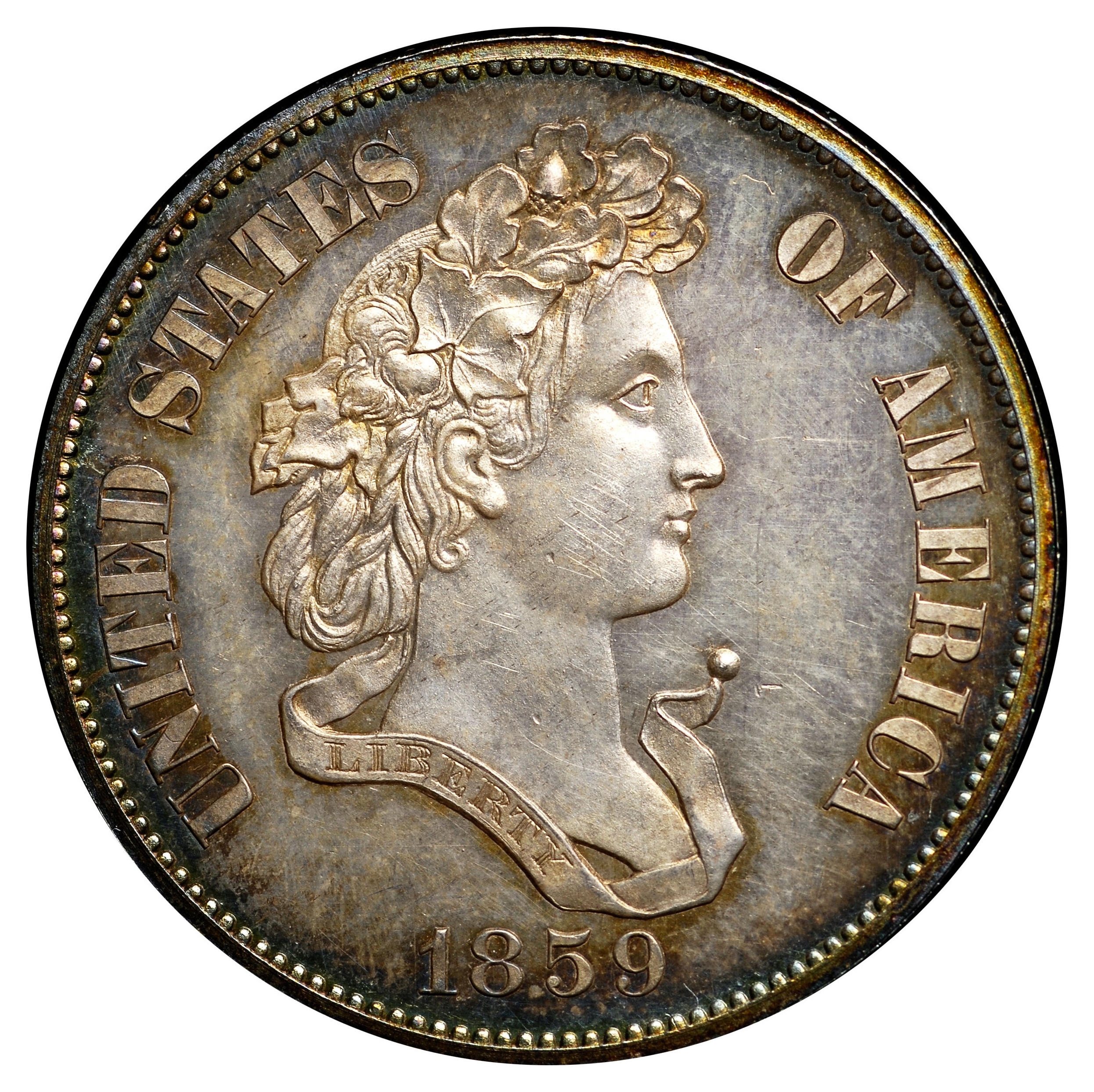
Cornelius Vermeule thought the Indian Head cent was better than Longacre's 1859 pattern half dollar.

Art historian Cornelius Vermeule had mixed emotions about the Indian Head cent: "Longacre enriched the mythology of American coinage in a pleasant if unpretentious fashion. Given his pattern half-dollar designs of 1859 as a yardstick, he could have done worse." In another comparison, Vermeule suggested, "far from a major creation aesthetically or iconographically, and far less attractive to the eye than the [flying eagle], the Indian head cent was at least to achieve the blessing of popular appeal. The coin became perhaps the most beloved and typically American of any piece great or small in the American series. Great art the coin was not, but it was one of the first products of the United States mints to achieve the common touch."

== Production ==
=== Redesign and surplus (1859–1861) ===
Production of the Indian Head cent for commerce began at the start of 1859. As issued for circulation, the pieces differ in some particulars from the pattern 1858 cent of similar design; Longacre sharpened some details. The pattern coin had the laurel leaves in the reverse wreath in bunches of five leaves; the issued 1859 cent has them in bunches of six. Cents dated 1858 with the adopted reverse (with six-leaf bunches) are known, were most likely struck in 1859, and are extremely rare.

In 1860, the reverse of the cent was changed to feature an oak wreath and a narrow shield; such reverses are also known on 1859-dated pieces struck as patterns. According to Richard Snow in his guidebook to Flying Eagle and Indian Head cents, this was not due to problems with the "Laurel Wreath" reverse design used in 1859, as full details survive on many extant pieces. Walter Breen, however, suggested that the feathers and curls on the obverse did not strike as well as they would later, and that "this may account for Snowden's decision to change the design again". David Lange, in his history of the Mint, states that it was to give the coin, quoting Snowden, "more National character". All 1859 cents and some from 1860 have the cutoff of Liberty's bust on the obverse end with a point; most 1860 cents and all later issues have it rounded.

Tens of millions of Flying Eagle cents had been issued in exchange for the old American coppers and small Spanish silver. The Spanish silver was still flowing into the Mint in early 1859 and, at Snowden's urging, Congress on March 3 of that year extended the redemption of these foreign coins, legal tender in the US until 1857, for another two years. Neil Carothers, in his work on small-denomination currency, challenged this decision as unnecessary—deprived of legal tender status, the remaining Spanish silver would have been eliminated through sales to banks for their bullion. Those who brought the old coins to the Mint received cents for them, at first Flying Eagle, and then Indian Head. In the year following the renewal, some forty million Indian Head cents were issued, meaning nearly a hundred million copper-nickel cents had entered commerce since 1857. As the coin did not circulate in the South and West due to prejudice against base-metal money, they choked commerce. No one had to take them; no law made them legal tender. At Snowden's urging Congress in June 1860 ended the exchange. Nevertheless, as Snowden admitted in his annual report that year, there were too many cents in circulation. In October 1860, The Bankers' Magazine and Statistical Register reported that there were ten million cents in commerce in New York City above what was needed, and if anyone wished to order in bulk, they could be purchased at a discount.

=== Shortage and redesign (1862–1864) ===
The surplus of cents was relieved by the economic chaos engendered by the American Civil War, which began in 1861. At the end of that year, the banks stopped paying out gold, which thereafter commanded a premium over paper money. These greenbacks, beginning in the following year, were issued in large quantities by the federal government. Silver vanished from commerce in June 1862, as the price of that metal rose, leaving the cent the sole federal coin that had not entirely vanished from commerce through hoarding. The glut of cents had by then abated, as merchants had stored them away in quantity—one New York City floor collapsed beneath the load. There were other means of making change which passed in the emergency, from postage stamps to privately issued tokens, but the public demand was for the cent—the Philadelphia Mint struck record numbers, and set aside part of the production to be transmitted to other cities. Nevertheless, by July 1862, the cent, in quantity, could only be purchased at a premium of 4% in paper money in major cities in the East. The copper-nickel pieces were nicknamed "nickels", or "nicks". Presentation of coins in payment carried with it no obligation to make change in the same. Accordingly, with a small quantity of "nicks", a shopper could make purchases with exact change, without receiving such makeshifts as merchants' credit slips, that others might not accept at the stated value.

By 1863, The Bankers' Magazine reported that the premium for cents in Philadelphia had risen to 20%. Thereafter, the premium decreased as there was a flood of metal tokens issued by merchants, which were widely accepted. Other war expedients, such as fractional currency, lessened the demand for the cent by taking the place of missing silver coinage. Small quantities of cents circulated among them, though many were still hoarded.

Government officials saw that the public readily accepted the merchant tokens. Many of these tokens were made of bronze, and when, in 1863, they attempted to restore coins to circulation, the use of bronze coins, which would not contain their face values in metal, was considered. In his annual report submitted October 1, 1863, Lincoln Administration Mint Director James Pollock noted that "whilst people expect a full value in their gold and silver coins, they merely want the inferior [base metal] money for convenience in making exact payments". He observed that the private cent tokens had sometimes contained as little as a fifth of a cent in metal, yet had still circulated. He proposed that the copper-nickel cent be replaced with a bronze piece of the same size. Pollock also wanted to eliminate nickel as a coinage metal; its hard alloys destroyed dies and machinery. On December 8, Pollock wrote to Treasury Secretary Salmon P. Chase, proposing a bronze cent and two-cent piece.

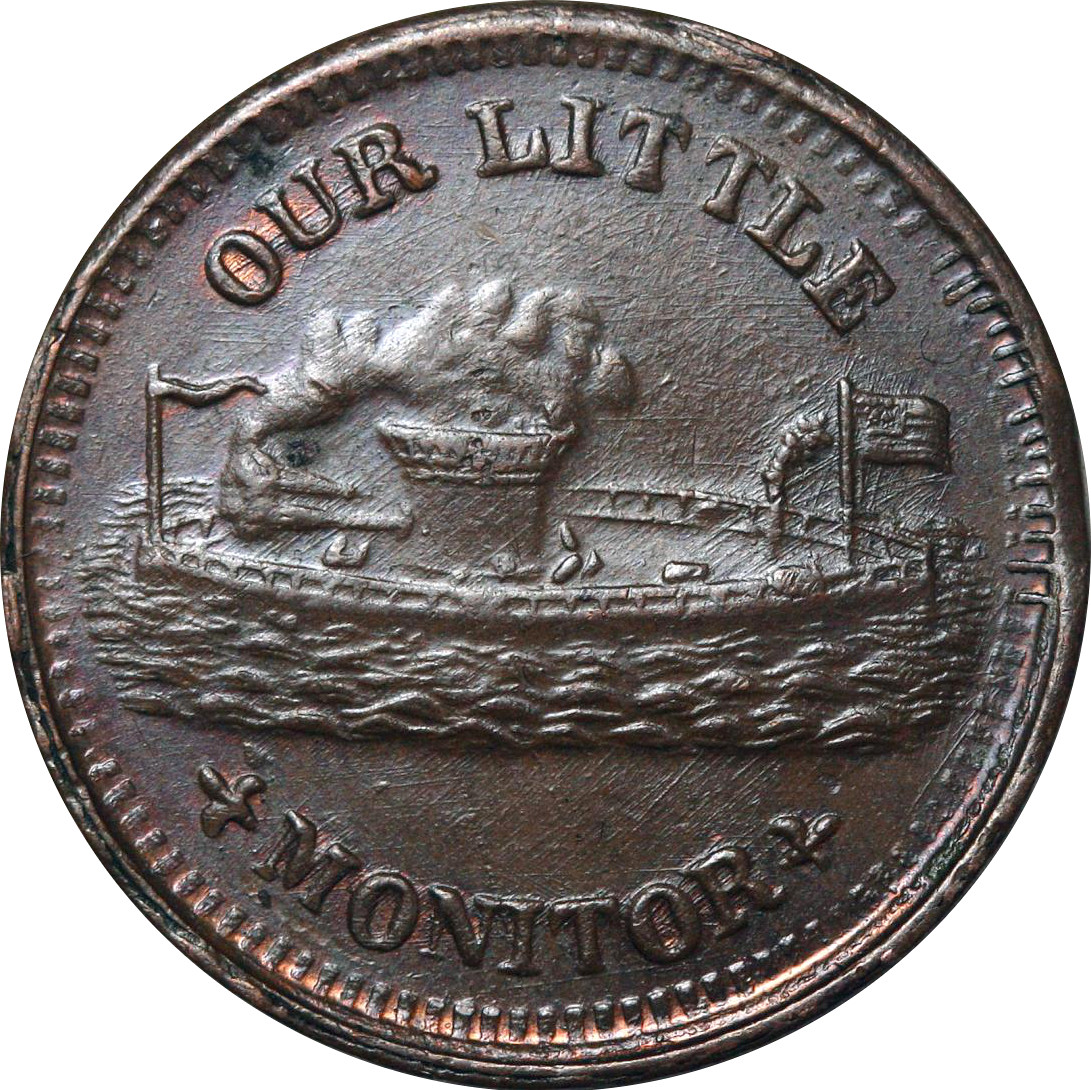
Cent-sized Civil War token, which was issued privately as federal coinage and was hoarded.

On March 2, 1864, Pollock wrote urgently to Chase, warning him that the Mint was running out of nickel and that demand for cents was at an all-time high. He also informed the Secretary that the United States Assay Commission, composed of citizens and officials who had met the previous month to test the nation's silver and gold coinage, had recommended the use of French bronze (95% copper with the remainder tin and zinc) as a coinage metal for the cent and a new two-cent piece. Three days later, Chase sent Pollock's December letter and draft legislation for bronze one- and two-cent pieces to Maine Senator William P. Fessenden, chairman of the Senate Finance Committee. Fessenden took no immediate action, and on March 16, Pollock wrote again to Chase, warning that the Mint was going to run out of nickel, much of which was imported. Chase forwarded his letter to Fessenden. Legislation was finally introduced by New Hampshire Senator Daniel Clark on March 22; Pollock's letters were read and apparently influenced proceedings as the Senate passed the bill without debate.

The domestic supply of nickel was at that time produced by a mine at Gap, Pennsylvania, owned by industrialist Joseph Wharton. On March 19, Pollock wrote to Chase that they had no more nickel, nor was any available from overseas; "we are thus shut up to the home supply; from the works of Mr. Wharton". Opposed to the removal of nickel from the cent, Wharton published a pamphlet in April 1864 proposing coinage of one-, two-, three-, five-, and ten-cent pieces of an alloy of one part nickel to three of copper, doubling the percentage of nickel used in the cent. Despite Wharton's efforts, on April 20, a select committee of the House of Representatives endorsed the bill. It was opposed by Pennsylvania's Thaddeus Stevens, who represented the mining area from which Wharton extracted his nickel. Wharton had spent $200,000 to develop his mine and ore refinement machinery, Stevens related, and it was unfair to deprive him of the major use of his metal. "Shall we destroy all this property because by coining with another metal more money may be saved to the government?" Besides, he argued, the copper-nickel alloy for the cent had been approved by Congress, and the new metal, which he termed "brass", would show rust. He was rebutted by Iowa Congressman John A. Kasson, chairman of the House Committee on Coinage, Weights, and Measures, who stated that the bronze alloy did not resemble brass, and he could not support the proposition that the government is bound to purchase from a supplier because he has spent money in anticipation of sales.

The legislation passed the House, and the Coinage Act of 1864 was signed by President Abraham Lincoln on April 22, 1864. The legislation made base metal coins legal tender for the first time: both cents and two-cent pieces were acceptable in quantities of up to ten. The government would not, however, redeem them in bulk. The act also outlawed the private one- and two-cent tokens, and later that year Congress abolished all such issues. The legislation did not allow for the redemption of the old copper-nickel cents; it had been drafted by Pollock, who was hoping that the seignorage income from issuing the new coins would help finance Mint operations, and he did not want it reduced by the recall of the old pieces. Wharton and his interests were appeased by the passage of a bill for a three-cent piece in 1865 and a five-cent piece in 1866, both of his proposed alloy, out of which the "nickel", as the latter coin has come to be known, is still struck. Despite this, Wharton and his nickel interests made repeated attempts to return nickel to the cent, each time failing, both as part of the deliberations over what became the Coinage Act of 1873, and in the early 1880s.

The copper-nickel cents from early in 1864 were generally bought up by speculators and did not circulate in large numbers. The Mint began producing bronze cents on May 13, three weeks after the passage of the Coinage Act, and they were released into circulation on May 20. Dies prepared for copper-nickel pieces were used to strike bronze. Sometime during 1864, Longacre sharpened his design for use in striking the softer bronze pieces, and also added his initial "L". It is not known when this was done; it may have been as early as May, with the new dies used alongside the old. These bronze pieces are often referred to as "1864-L" and "1864 No L". The "L" is known on 1863-dated pieces, in both metals, and on 1864-dated copper-nickel pieces—some of these issues, all extremely rare, were likely struck at a later date. The bronze cent was immediately accepted by the public, and heavy production of the issue soon alleviated the shortage of cents.

=== Later years (1865–1909) ===
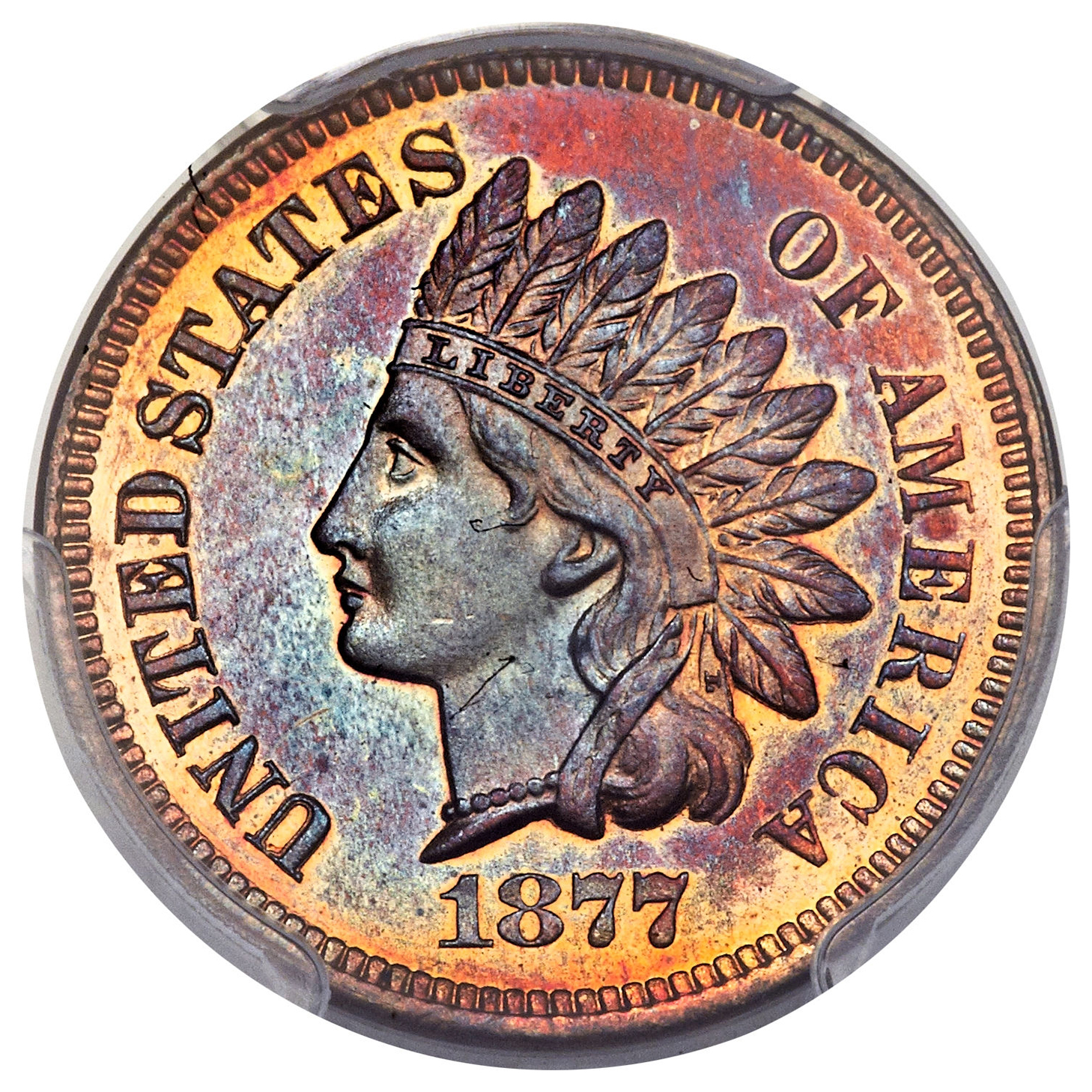
The 1877 Indian Head cent

In the postwar years, the heavy production of cents was scaled back, as hoarding ceased and some of the slack was taken up by other base-metal coins. Nevertheless, the various issues of small coins, at that time not redeemed by the government, caused another glut in commerce, which was not completely broken until the Act of March 3, 1871, allowed redemption of cents and other minor coins in lots of $20 or more. Pursuant to this act, over thirty million copper-nickel cents, of both the Indian Head and Flying Eagle designs, were redeemed; the Mint melted these for recoinage. Fifty-five million bronze cents were also sold to the government; beginning in 1874, the Mint re-issued these in response to commercial requests for cents, lowering the demand for new coins. Drops in the price of silver brought coins of that metal, hoarded for a decade or more, back into commerce, also decreasing demand. Between 1866 and 1878, production only occasionally exceeded ten million; the 1877 coin, with a circulation mintage of 852,500, is a scarcer date for the series. After 1881, there were few redemptions of bronze cents, due to high demand for the denomination, though copper-nickel cents continued to be redeemed and melted.

With the discontinuance of the two-cent piece and three-cent silver in 1873, the cent and the three-cent nickel were the sole survivors of the coins valued at less than five cents. The three-cent nickel, by this time, was unpopular because of its odd denomination and (with the return of silver coinage) its similarity in size to the dime. A three-cent postage rate had been one of the reasons why that denomination had begun, in the 1850s; in the early 1880s, the Post Office decreased the basic rate for letters to two cents. This change both increased demand for cents, and decreased the demand for the three-cent nickel, which was abolished in 1890. In most years of the 1880s, there were large issues of Indian Head cents. The exception was in the mid-1880s when poor economic times led to less demand for minor coins. No cents or five-cent nickels were minted after February 1885 until near the end of 1886. Production of undated dies into which the year of issue could be punched did continue, and during the hiatus in coin production, Chief Engraver Charles E. Barber modified the design, removing light outlines between the lettering on the obverse and the rest of the design, and making other changes. This led to two types for the 1886 Indian Head cent, which may be distinguished: on the Type I, the lowest feather on the obverse points between the I and the C in "AMERICA", while on the Type II it points between the C and the final A. Snow estimates that 14 million of the mintage of 17,654,290 were Type I, as were a majority of the 4,290 proof strikings.

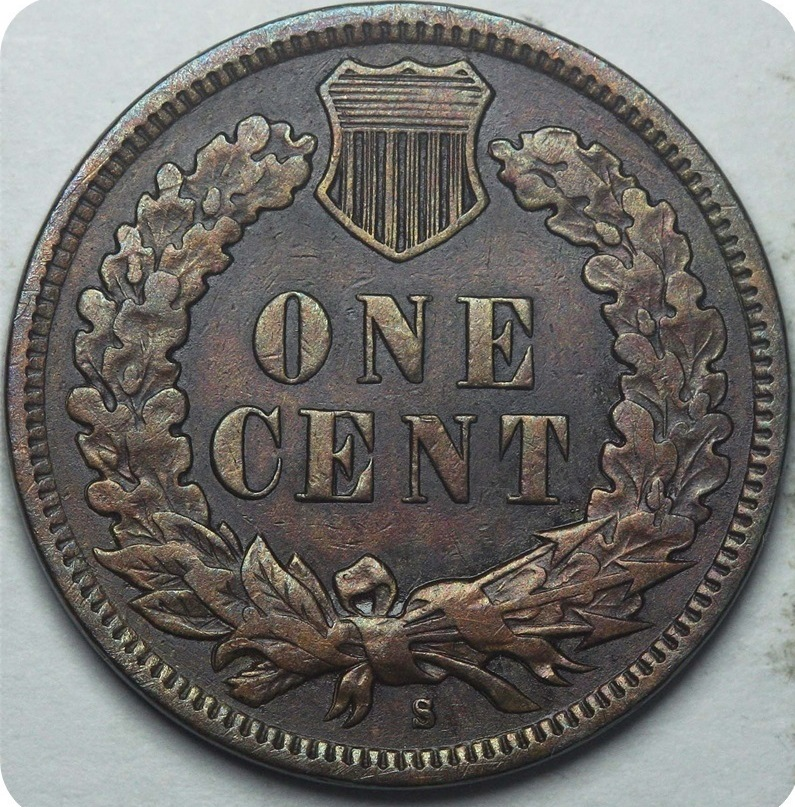
Reverse of a 1909-S Indian Head cent. The mint mark is located below the wreath.

The economic Panic of 1893 again caused a decrease in the number of cents produced, as coins accumulated in private hands were spent, creating a surplus. Aside from that, the final years of the series before its termination in 1909 were marked by large mintages, with 1907 topping the hundred million mark. A healthy economy in most years fueled demand, as did the increasing popularity of coin-operated machines, some of which could be found at penny arcades. By the early 20th century, the cent was accepted across the nation, but by law production of the cent was limited to the Philadelphia Mint. Treasury officials sought removal of this restriction, and for an increase in the annual appropriation to purchase base metals for production of the cent and nickel—the amount expended had remained the same since 1873, although demand for cents had greatly increased. By the Act of April 24, 1906, the Mint received permission to strike base metal coins at any mint, and the appropriation was quadrupled to $200,000. Small quantities of cents were struck at the San Francisco Mint in 1908 and 1909; the 1909-S cent, with a mintage of 309,000 pieces, is the lowest mintage of the series and commands a premium as a key date.

== Mintage figures ==
Mintage amounts for Indian Head cents
Year	Mint	Mintage	Comments
1859	(P)	36,400,000	First issue of the series
1860	(P)	20,566,000	First issue with a shield on the reverse
1861	(P)	10,100,000	
1862	(P)	28,075,000	
1863	(P)	49,840,000	
1864 (Copper)	(P)	13,740,000	
1864 (Bronze)	(P)	39,233,714	Varieties with and without "L"
1865	(P)	35,429,286	
1866	(P)	9,826,000	
1867	(P)	9,821,000	
1868	(P)	10,266,500	
1869	(P)	6,420,000	
1870	(P)	5,275,000	
1871	(P)	3,929,500	
1872	(P)	4,042,000	
1873	(P)	11,676,500	Closed and open "3" varieties
1874	(P)	14,187,500	
1875	(P)	13,528,000	
1876	(P)	7,944,000	
1877	(P)	852,500	One of only two issues of the series with a mintage below a million Key date
1878	(P)	5,999,850	
1879	(P)	16,231,200	
1880	(P)	38,964,955	
1881	(P)	39,211,575	
1882	(P)	38,581,100	
1883	(P)	45,589,109	
1884	(P)	23,261,742	
1885	(P)	11,765,384	
1886	(P)	17,654,290	Two types of obverses
1887	(P)	45,226,483	
1888	(P)	37,494,414	
1889	(P)	48,869,361	
1890	(P)	57,182,854	
1891	(P)	47,072,350	
1892	(P)	37,649,832	
1893	(P)	46,642,195	
1894	(P)	16,752,132	
1895	(P)	38,343,636	
1896	(P)	39,057,293	
1897	(P)	50,466,330	
1898	(P)	49,823,079	
1899	(P)	53,600,031	
1900	(P)	66,833,794	
1901	(P)	79,611,143	
1902	(P)	87,376,723	
1903	(P)	85,094,493	
1904	(P)	61,328,015	
1905	(P)	80,719,163	
1906	(P)	96,022,255	
1907	(P)	108,138,618	Highest mintage of the series
1908	(P)	32,327,987	
1908	S	1,115,000	Scarce issue
1909	(P)	14,370,645	
1909	S	309,000	Last issue of the series Lowest mintage of the series Key date

== Replacement ==
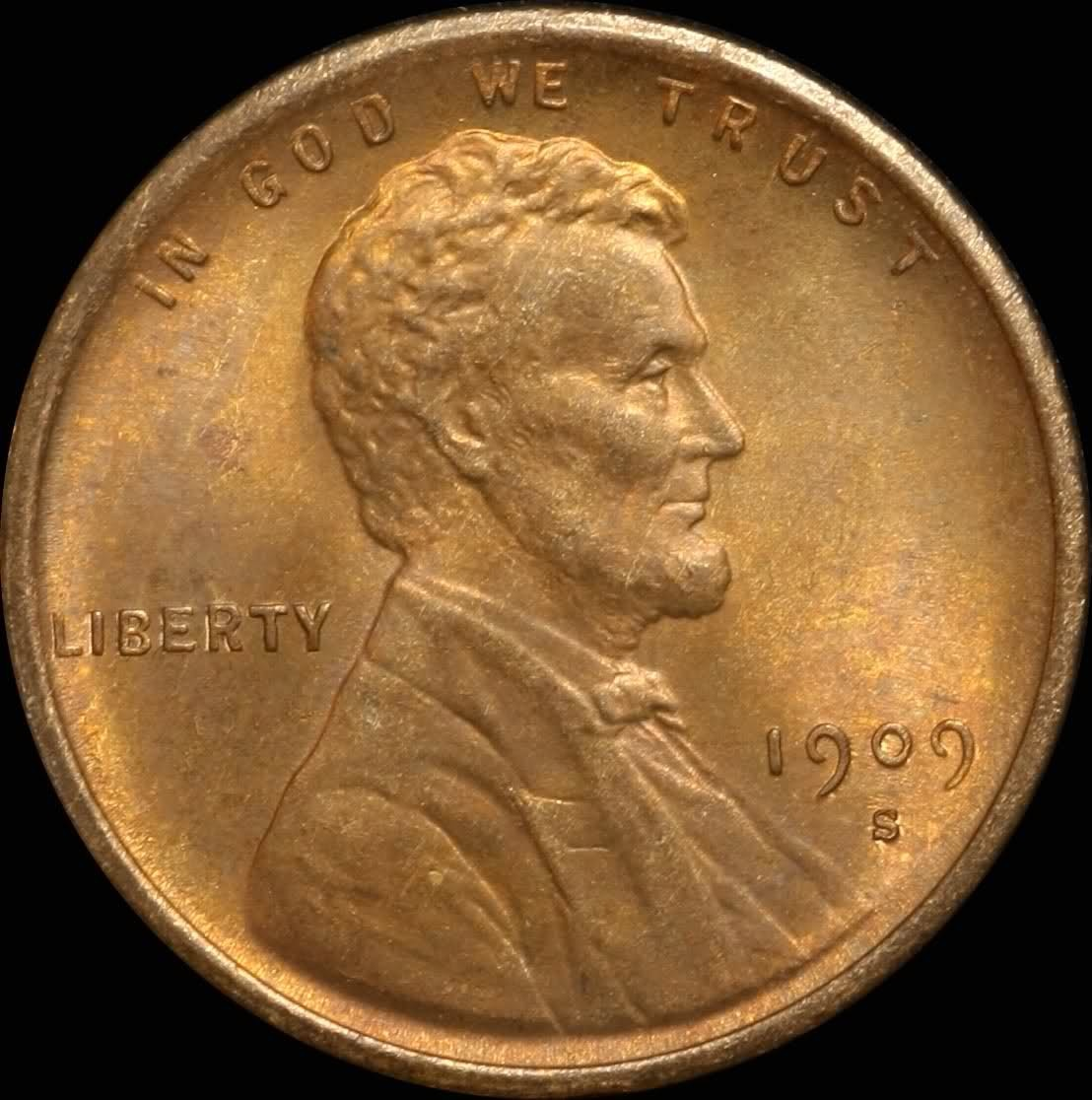
1909-S Lincoln cent

Congress passed legislation in 1890 allowing the Mint to alter designs that had been in use for 25 years without the need for legislative authorization. In 1904, President Theodore Roosevelt wrote to his Secretary of the Treasury, Leslie Mortier Shaw, complaining that U.S. coinage lacked artistic merit, and enquiring if it would be possible to engage a private artist, such as sculptor Augustus Saint-Gaudens, to prepare new coin designs. At Roosevelt's instructions, the Mint hired Saint-Gaudens to redesign the cent and the four gold pieces: the double eagle ($20), eagle ($10), half eagle ($5), and quarter eagle ($2.50). As the designs of those pieces had remained the same for 25 years, they could be changed without an act of Congress, as could the Indian Head cent.

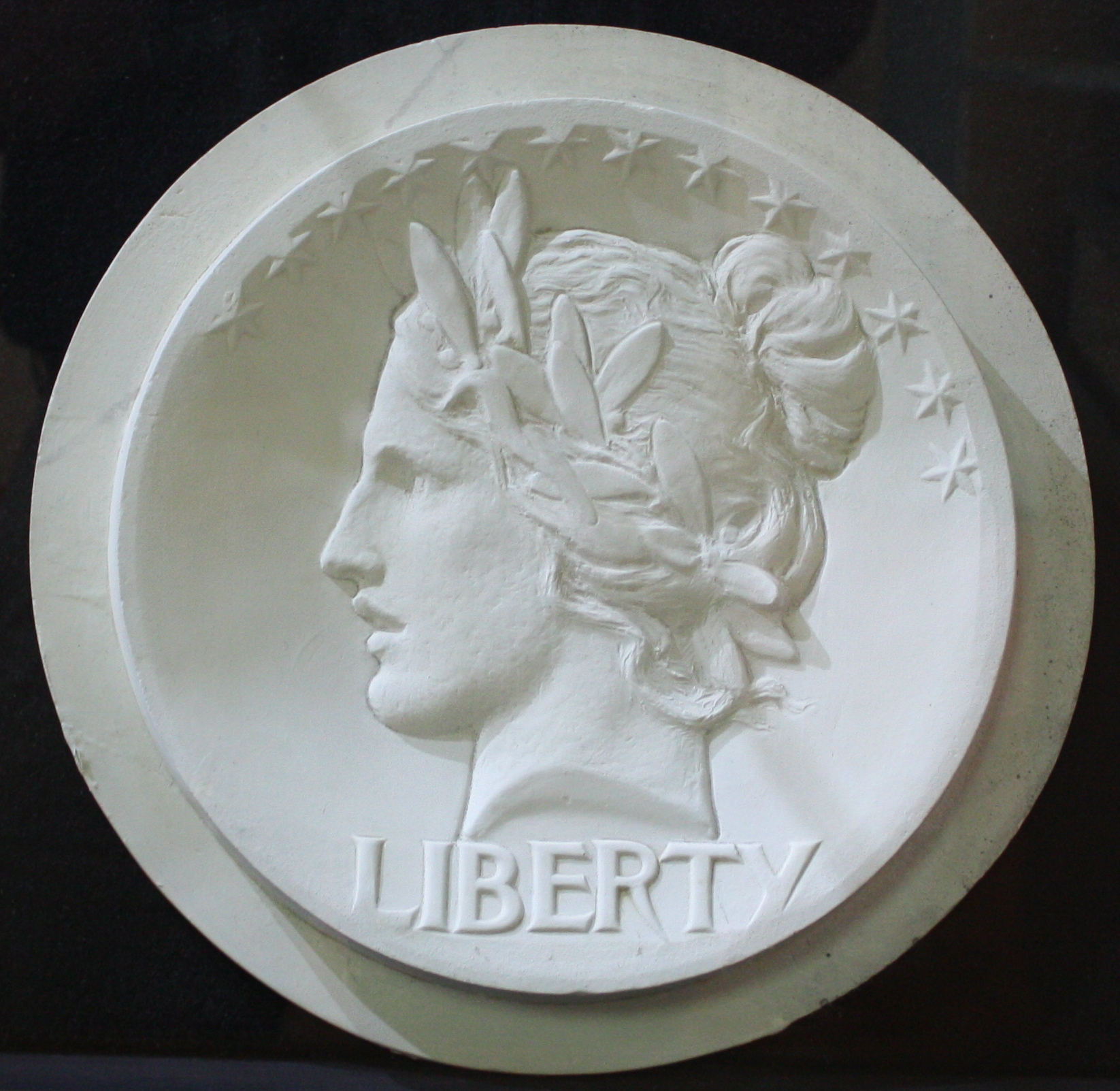
Saint-Gaudens' model for the cent obverse: Liberty with an Indian headdress added, the design was later developed for the $10 piece.

Saint-Gaudens originally conceived a flying eagle design for the cent, but at Roosevelt's request, developed it for the $20 piece after learning that under the 1873 act, an eagle could not appear on the cent. Writer and friend Witter Bynner recalled that in January 1907, Saint-Gaudens was seriously ill with cancer, and was carried to his studio for ten minutes a day to critique the work of his assistants on current projects, including the cent. Saint-Gaudens died on August 3, 1907, without having submitted another design for the cent.

With the redesign of the four gold denominations completed by 1908, Roosevelt turned his attention to the cent. The centenary of the birth of assassinated president Abraham Lincoln would occur in February 1909, and large numbers of privately manufactured souvenirs were already being issued. Many citizens had written to the Treasury Department, proposing a Lincoln coin, and Roosevelt was interested in honoring his fellow Republican. This was a break with previous American numismatic tradition; before the Lincoln cent, no regularly circulating U.S. coin had featured an actual person (as opposed to idealized personifications, as of "liberty").

In late 1908, Roosevelt sat for sculptor Victor David Brenner, who was designing a medal for the Panama Canal Commission. It is uncertain how Brenner was selected to design the coin, but in January 1909, Mint Director Frank A. Leach hired him to design a Lincoln cent. This went into circulation later in 1909, putting an end to the Indian Head cent series.

== Collecting ==
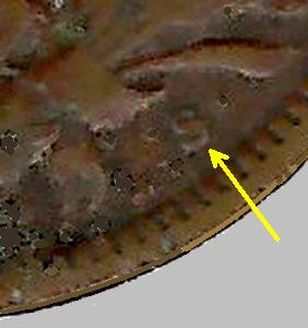
'S' mint mark (designated with arrow) on the reverse of a 1908 S Indian head cent

Indian Head cents were popular among coin collectors even in the half-century when they were produced; since then, with the growth of the hobby, interest has increased. The 1930s introduction of inexpensive coin albums to house the series and encourage collectors to seek a complete set came at a time when the bronze version of the Indian Head cent was still common in pocket change. They were not widely studied until the 1960s; numismatic writer Tom DeLorey, in his introduction to Snow's book, ascribes this to prejudice among numismatists who grew up with the Indian Head cent as a common circulation piece. He notes that the 1960 edition of R.S. Yeoman's A Guide Book of United States Coins (commonly, the Red Book) listed only four dates for which there were varieties, one of which, the overdate 1869/68 was in error, as the final digit was actually over another 9. The 2018 edition of the Red Book lists varieties for 12 dates.

Like most other denominations of U.S. coins, the 1873 may be found in two varieties, depending on the appearance of the final digit of the date: the "Close 3" or "Closed 3" is from early dies, but after Chief Coiner A. Loudon Snowden complained that the "3" looked too much like an "8", Chief Engraver William Barber modified his work to create the "Open 3". Some 1875 pieces have a dot appearing on the letter "N" in "ONE" on the reverse. This may have been a secret mark, added to catch a thief within the Philadelphia Mint.

The Indian Head cent was struck in large quantities and most dates remain inexpensive: Yeoman lists all dates from 1900 to 1908 from Philadelphia at $2 in Good-4 condition. The record holder for the denomination is a proof specimen of the 1864-L, of which there were an estimated 20 struck; it sold for $161,000 in 2012.

Preceded by Flying Eagle cent	United States one-cent coin (1859–1909)	Succeeded by Lincoln cent
