= Lyndall Bass =

American realist painter and teacher

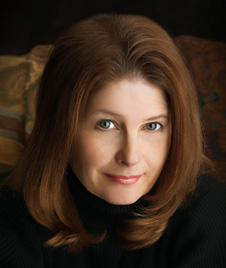
- Bass in 2008
- Born: July 5, 1952 (age 73); North Carolina, United States
- Notable work: Union Shield Penny
- Movement: Realism
- Awards: National Society of Arts and Letters award; Franklin Mint Award of Excellence; First Purchase Award

Lyndall Bass (born July 5, 1952) is an American painter and teacher who primarily paints still lifes, flower paintings and symbolist figure paintings. She lives and works in Santa Fe, New Mexico. She is the designer of the Shield Cent reverse of the final Lincoln cent released for circulation in 2010.

== Biography ==
Bass was born in North Carolina. She attended the Pennsylvania Academy of Fine Art, studying under Arthur DeCosta, Robert Beverly Hale and Will Barnet. Her lineage through DeCosta reaches from his teacher Daniel Garber who was taught by Thomas Anshutz, a student of Thomas Eakins. Will Barnet's legacy extended through his teacher, Philip L. Hale to Claude Monet as presented in the introduction to Richard M. Doty's book about Barnet's life and work. Bass completed her undergraduate studies at Indiana University with a BA in Fine Art in 1984, then went on to receive an MA in Instructional Systems Design from IU in 1987.

Bass lives, teaches and works in Santa Fe, New Mexico. She is married to the painter Geoffrey Laurence.

== Art career ==
In New Mexico, she discovered the techniques of Jacques Maroger through a friendship with Siegfried Hahn, whose influence provided connections with European artistic thinking and practice. Hahn's education as an artist included exposure to classical training at the Royal Academy in London.

Bass' work is based on reflections of classical tradition within a contemporary framework. Her primary mediums are oil paint and graphite on paper.

== Awards and recognition ==
Bass has received numerous awards including a National Society of Arts and Letters award, a Franklin Mint Award of Excellence and a First Purchase Award in the 1983 exhibition "Realism Today" from the Evansville Museum. She is the recipient of a 2004 Robert Rauschenberg Foundation grant for working painters. In 1980 she received a National Society of Arts and Letters award in an Indiana state art competition. Her most recent award is from the United States Mint for her design of the 2010 permanent Lincoln cent reverse design, known as the “Shield Cent”. Bass' design was sculpted on the reverse by staff sculptor Joseph Menna and both of their initials appear on the reverse of the coin under each side of the scroll bearing the words "ONE CENT".
