= United States coinage type set =

United States coinage type set is a visual collection of each of the types of coins produced by the US Mints. A "Type set" collection is enjoyed by some collectors of coins who try to collect one example of as many types of coins as they can.

Due to various reasons (including prohibitive cost), collectors will sometimes group several different coins together as one "type." For example, one could collect a Liberty Seated dime, quarter, and half dollar, and call that their example of a Liberty Seated coin for each denomination. Or, they could choose to collect an example of sub-types within the Liberty Seated design, including the with and without arrows at date, and with and without mottos.

Additionally, delineating sub-types within a particular design is not always consistent. For example, almost all type collectors consider the 1909 "V.D.B." Lincoln cent to be different from the 1909 no-"V.D.B." Lincoln cent (where the designer's initials, V.D.B., were displayed on the bottom of the reverse and removed about a month later). However, the "V.D.B." initials were returned to the Lincoln cent in 1918 on the bottom of the bust on the obverse, and almost no type collector considers this a separate type. Likewise in the Lincoln cent series, the composition change in 1943 to steel and the composition change in 1982 from bronze to copper-plated zinc are considered separate types by almost all, but the brass composition used in 1944-1946 is not considered a separate type from the 1947 return to bronze. (The Lincoln cent series is full of other examples, including modifications to the size of Lincoln's bust during the early 1970s).

Consequently, each collector will need to decide for themselves how specific they wish to be when putting together a U.S. coin type set, though the decision is often made for them if they choose specific albums, such as the very popular Dansco 7070.

== US Copper Type Coins ==
Half Cents:	Photo
Liberty Cap (Left), 1793	NNC-US-1793-½C-Liberty Cap Half Cent (left)
Liberty Cap (Right), 1794-1797	NNC-US-1794-½C-Liberty Cap Half Cent (right)
Draped Bust, 1800-1808	NNC-US-1806-½C-Draped Bust Half Cent
Classic Head, 1809-1835	NNC-US-1828-½C-Classic Head Half Cent (proof)
Coronet, 1849-1857	NNC-US-1844-½C-Braided Hair Half Cent (proof)

Large Cents:	Photo
Flowing Hair silver centered cent, 1792	
Flowing Hair Chain Cents, 1793	
Flowing Hair Strawberry Wreath Cents, 1793	
Flowing Hair Wreath Cents, 1793	
Liberty Cap cents, 1793-1796	
Draped Bust, 1796-1807	
Classic Head, 1808-1814	
Coronet, 1816-1839	
Coronet (braided hair), 1840-1857	

Small Cents:	Photo
Flying Eagle, 1856-1858	
Indian Head, laurel wreath, 1859	
Indian Head, oak leaf wreath, copper nickel, 1860-1864 Indian Head, oak leaf wreath, bronze, 1864-1909	
Lincoln Head, VDB, 1909	
Lincoln Head, wheat reverse, 1909-1958	
Lincoln Head, steel, 1943	
Lincoln Head, Memorial reverse, (bronze) 1959-1982, (copper plated zinc) 1982-2008	
Lincoln Head, Bicentennial, (copper plated zinc) 2009	
Lincoln Head, Union shield, (copper plated zinc) 2010-	

2 Cent piece:	Photo
2 Cent Piece, Bronze, 1864-1872	

== US Nickel Type Coins ==
Nickel 3 Cent pieces:	Photo
Nickel, 1865-1889	

5 cent Nickels:	Photo
Shield (with rays), 1866-1867	
Shield (no rays), 1867-1883	
Liberty Head (no cents), 1883	
Liberty Head (with cents), 1883-1912	
Buffalo (Variety 1), 1913	
Buffalo (Variety 2), 1913-1938	
Jefferson 1938-2003	
Jefferson, 35% silver, 1942-1945	
Jefferson, Westward Journey, 2004-2006	
Jefferson, facing forward, 2006-	

== US Silver Type Coins ==
Silver 3 Cent pieces:	Photo
Silver, 1851-1873	

Half dimes:	Photo
Bust Half Dime, 1792	
Flowing Hair Half Dime, 1794-1795	
Draped Bust Half Dime, 1796-1805	
Capped Bust, 1829-1837	
Liberty Seated, 1837-1859 Liberty Seated (with arrows), 1853-1855	
Liberty Seated (with legend, new reverse), 1860-1873	

Dimes:	Photo
Draped Bust, 1796-1807	
Capped Bust, 1809-1837	
Liberty Seated (no stars), 1837-1838 Liberty Seated (with stars), 1838-1860 Liberty Seated (arrows at date), 1853-1855 Liberty Seated (with legend), 1860-1891	
Liberty Head ("Barber"), 1892-1916	
Mercury, 1916-1945	
Roosevelt, silver, 1946-1964 Roosevelt, clad, 1965-Present	

20 cent piece:	Photo
Liberty Seated, 1875-1878	

Quarters:	Photo
Draped Bust, Small Eagle 1796	
Draped Bust, Heraldic Eagle 1804–1807	
Capped Bust 1815-1838	
Liberty Seated (No motto), 1838-1865 Liberty Seated (arrows at date), 1853-1855 Liberty Seated (with legend), 1856-1891	
Liberty Head ("Barber"), 1892-1916	
Standing Liberty (type 1), 1916-1917	
Standing Liberty (type 2), 1917-1930	
Washington, silver, 1932-1964 Washington, clad, 1965-1974, 1977-1998	
Washington, clad, bicentennial, 1975-1976	
Washington, Statehood, 1999-2008	
Washington, District of Columbia and US Territories, 2009	
Washington, America the Beautiful, 2010-2021	
Washington, Washington crossing the Delaware, 2021	
Washington, American Women Quarters, 2022-2025	

Half Dollars:	Photo
Flowing Hair: 1794-1795	
Draped Bust: 1796-1807	
Capped Bust: (lettered edge), 1807-1836 (reeded edge), 1836-1839	
Liberty Seated: (no motto), 1839-1865 (with arrows), 1853-1855 (with motto), 1866-1891	
Liberty Head ("Barber"), 1892-1915	
Walking Liberty, 1916-1947	
Franklin Half, 1948-1963	
Kennedy Half: (90% silver) 1964 (40% silver) 1965-1970 (Cu/Ni Clad) 1971-1974, 1977-	
Kennedy Half, clad, bicentennial, 1975-1976	

Silver, clad, and "golden" Dollars:	Photo
Flowing Hair, 1794-1795	
Draped Bust, 1795-1804	
Liberty Seated, 1840-1873	
"Trade Dollar" 1873-1878 (circulation), 1873-1885 (proofs)	
Morgan Dollar, 1878-1921	
Peace Dollar, 1921-1935	
Eisenhower Dollar, 1971-1974, 1977-1978	
Eisenhower Dollar, bicentennial, 1975-1976	
Susan B. Anthony Dollar, 1979-1981, 1999	
Sacagawea "Golden" Dollar, 2000-2008	
Presidential Dollar, 2007-2016, 2020-present	
Sacagawea "Native American" Dollar, 2009-	

== US Gold type coins ==
Gold 1 dollar coins:	Photo
Liberty head, 1849-1854	
Indian Princess gold dollar, 1854-1889	

Gold "Quarter Eagle" $2.50 coins:	Photo
Draped Bust, 1796-1807	
Capped Bust, 1808-1834	
Classic Head, 1834-1839	
Liberty Head, 1840-1907	
Indian, 1908-1929	

Gold "Three-dollar" $3.00 coins:	Photo
Indian Princess, 1854-1889	

Gold "Half Eagle" $5 coins:	Photo
Draped Bust, 1795-1807	
Capped Bust, 1807-1834	
Classic Head, 1834-1838	
Liberty Head, 1839-1908	
Indian, 1908-1929	

Gold "Eagle" $10 coins:	Photo
Draped Bust, 1795-1804	
Liberty Head, 1838-1907	
Indian, 1907-1933	

Gold "Double Eagle" $20 coins:	Photo
Liberty Head, 1849-1907	
St. Gaudens, 1907-1933	

== Bullion coins ==
Silver Eagle, .999 fine Silver bullion coins:	Photo
1 Troy Ounce Type 1, 1986-2021 1 Troy Ounce Type 2, 2021-date	

Gold Eagle, 22 karat Gold bullion coins:	Photo
Tenth-Ounce, 1986-date Quarter-Ounce, 1986-date Half-Ounce, 1986-date One-Ounce, 1986-date	

Gold Buffalo, .9999 fine Gold bullion coins:	Photo
Tenth-Ounce, 2008 Quarter-Ounce, 2008; Half-Ounce, 2008 One-Ounce, 2008-date	

Platinum Eagle, .9995 fine Platinum bullion coins:	Photo
Type, date range	
