= Flowing Hair =

Former design used on United States coinage

Flowing Hair coinage was issued in the United States between 1793 and 1795. The design was used for the first half dime, half dollar, dollar, and the first two large cents.

== Flowing Hair coins ==
- Silver center cent (1792)
- Chain cent (1793)
- Wreath cent (1793)
- Half disme (1792)
- Half dime (1794–95)
- Half dollar (1794–95)
- Dollar (1794–95)

== See also ==
- Draped Bust
- Classic Head
- Capped Bust
- Seated Liberty
- Stella, a $4 coin minted in both "flowing hair" and "coiled hair" varieties in 1879 and 1880.
