= Liberty cap =

Liberty cap most often refers to:

- Phrygian cap or pileus (hat), emblematic of a slave's manumission in classical antiquity

Liberty cap may also refer to:

- Liberty Cap (California), a granite dome in Yosemite National Park
- Liberty Cap, a prominent peak on Mount Rainier
- Liberty cap (Psilocybe semilanceata), a psilocybin mushroom
- Liberty Cap half cent, an early coin of the United States dollar
- Liberty Cap large cent, an early coin of the United States dollar
