= Coronet large cent =

Coin issued by the United States Mint from 1816 to 1857

- United States
- Value: 0.01 U.S. Dollar
- Mass: 10.89 g
- Diameter: 29 (1836–1839) or 27 (1839–1857 and 1868) mm
- Edge: Plain
- Composition: 100% Cu
- Years of minting: 1816–1857 and 1868
- Mint marks: None; all large cents were minted at the Philadelphia Mint.

Obverse
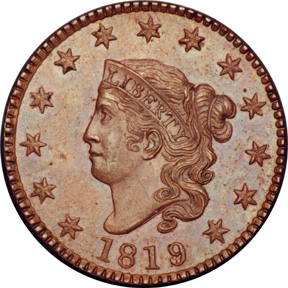
- Design: Liberty
- Designer: Robert Scot
- Design date: 1816
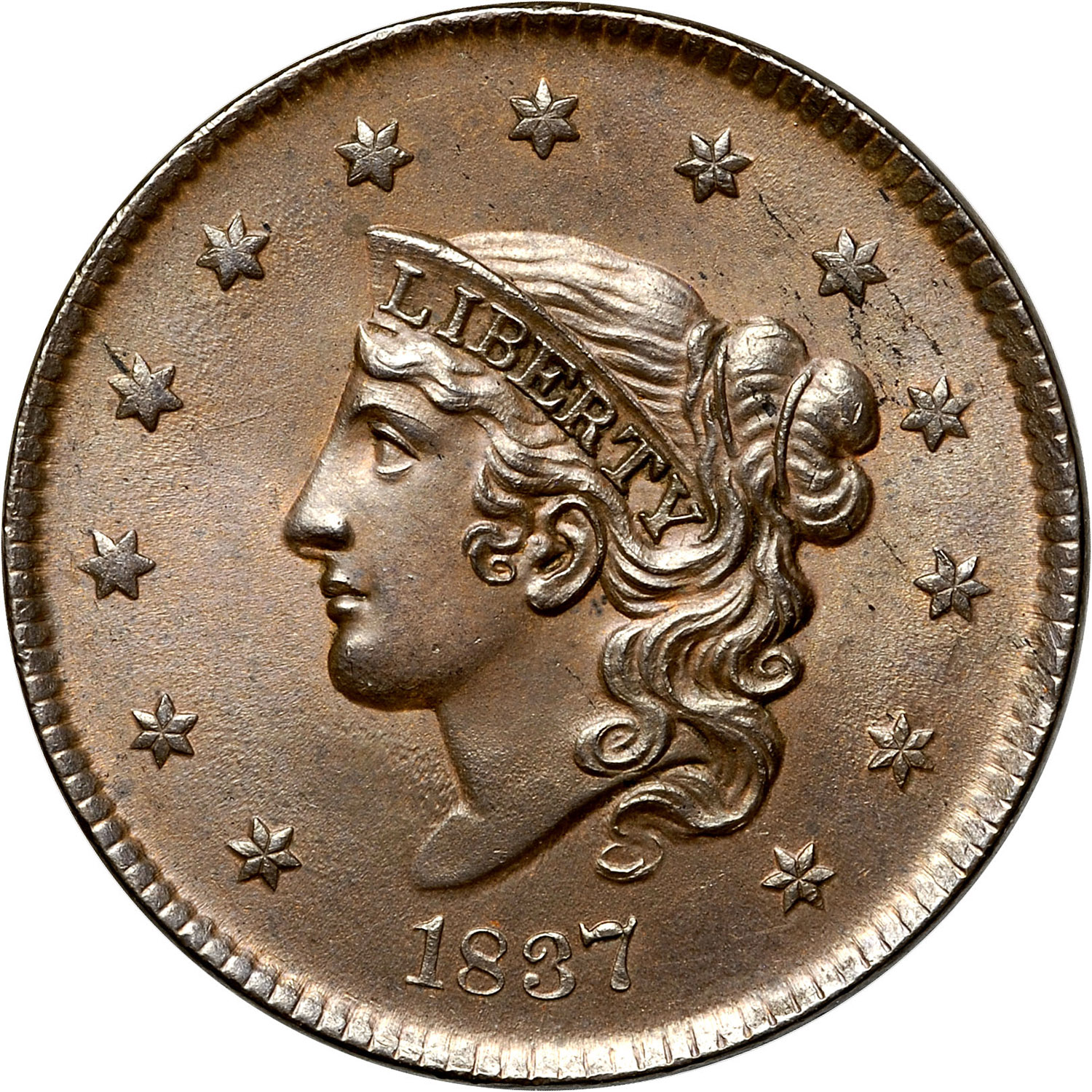
- Design: Liberty
- Designer: Robert Scot (original design), Christian Gobrecht (modified design)
- Design date: 1836
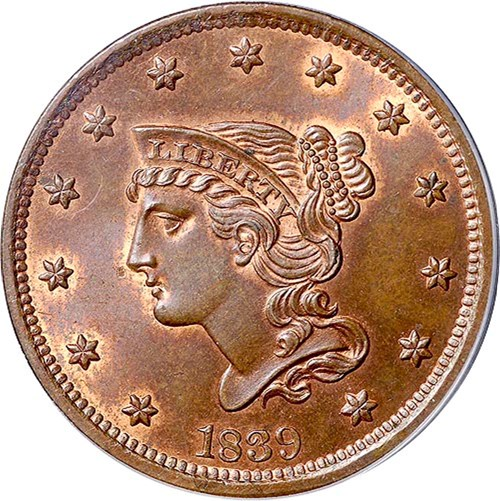
- Design: Liberty, Braided Hair, Petite Head
- Designer: Robert Scot (original design), Christian Gobrecht (modified design)
- Design date: 1839
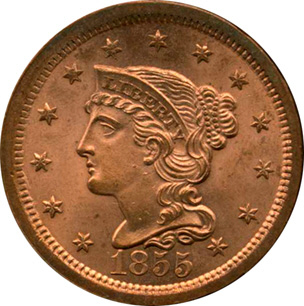
- Design: Liberty, Braided Hair, Mature Head
- Designer: Robert Scot (original design), Christian Gobrecht (modified design)
- Design date: 1843

Reverse
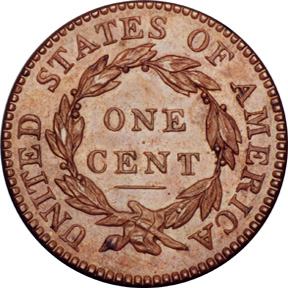
- Design: Wreath
- Designer: Robert Scot
- Design date: 1816
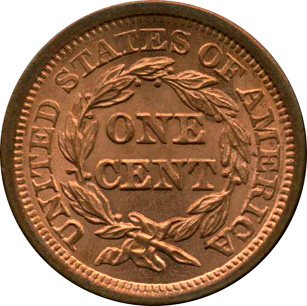
- Design: Wreath
- Designer: Robert Scot (original design), Christian Gobrecht (modified design)
- Design date: 1839

The Coronet large cent was a type of large cent issued by the United States Mint at the Philadelphia Mint from 1816 until 1857.

There are two similar designs of the Coronet large cent, the Matron Head and the Braided Hair, the latter with a slightly altered profile. This was the last large cent produced by the mint, being replaced by the reduced diameter Flying Eagle cent in 1857.

== History ==
During the War of 1812, a trade embargo was imposed between the United States and England, which had supplied the US Mint with copper planchets. The mint's supply was exhausted in 1814, and no Classic Head cents were produced dated 1815. It has often been written that no cents at all were struck that year, but coinage did resume in December 1815 using an 1814 or 1816-dated die.

Once the embargo was lifted and the mint received new planchets, large cent production resumed, this time with a new design of the goddess Liberty by Robert Scot. The design change was made because the Classic Head cents received much criticism.

In 1823, only proof cents were produced during the calendar year, all others were made in 1824 using back-dated dies.

The new cents, known as Matron Head cents, were not much better, however, and numismatist Walter Breen called the design "a spectacularly ugly head of Ms. Liberty". In 1836, Christian Gobrecht made several modifications to the design, giving the bust of Liberty a younger appearance.

Gobrecht made further changes in 1839, creating the "Petite Head" Braided Hair cent. In 1843, the bust was enlarged and tilted upward, this design is known as the "Mature Head".

== Varieties ==
=== Matron Head varieties ===
Matron Head varieties (1816–1839)
| Year | Variety | Mintage | Notes |
|---|---|---|---|
| 1816 | – | 2,820,982 | |
| 1817 | 13 stars | 3,948,400 | |
| 1817 | 15 stars error | 3,948,400 | Likely to have been caused by Robert Scot's poor eyesight due to age |
| 1818 | – | 3,167,000 | |
| 1819 | Standard date | 2,671,000 | |
| 1819 | 9 over 8 error | 2,671,000 | |
| 1820 | Small date | 4,407,550 | |
| 1820 | Large date | 4,407,550 | |
| 1820 | 20 over 19 error | 4,407,550 | Both small date and large date known |
| 1821 | – | 389,000 | |
| 1822 | – | 2,072,339 | |
| 1823 | Standard date | 2,072,339 | |
| 1823 | 3 over 2 error | 2,072,339 | |
| 1823 | Restrike | An estimated 240 examples exist | Believed to have been created around the same time as the 1804 restrike large cent |
| 1823 | Silver restrike | >2 | Believed to have been created around the same time as the 1804 restrike large cent |
| 1824 | Standard date | 1,262,000 | |
| 1824 | 4 over 2 error | 1,262,000 | |
| 1825 | – | 1,461,100 | |
| 1826 | Standard date | 1,517,425 | |
| 1826 | 6 over 5 error | 1,517,425 | |
| 1827 | – | 2,357,732 | |
| 1828 | Large date | 2,260,624 | |
| 1828 | Small date | 2,260,624 | |
| 1829 | Large lettering | 1,414,500 | |
| 1829 | Small lettering | 1,414,500 | |
| 1830 | Large lettering | 1,711,500 | |
| 1830 | Small lettering | 1,711,500 | |
| 1831 | Large lettering | 3,359,260 | |
| 1831 | Small lettering | 3,359,260 | |
| 1832 | Large lettering | 2,362,000 | |
| 1832 | Small lettering | 2,362,000 | |
| 1833 | – | 2,739,000 | |
| 1834 | Small 8, large stars | 1,855,100 | |
| 1834 | Large 8, small stars | 1,855,100 | |
| 1834 | Large 8, large stars, small lettering | 1,855,100 | |
| 1834 | Large 8, large stars, large lettering | 1,855,100 | |
| 1835 | Small 8, small stars | 3,878,400 | |
| 1835 | Large 8, large stars | 3,878,400 | |
| 1835 | Type of 1836 | 3,878,400 | |
| 1836 | – | 2,111,000 | |
| 1837 | Type of 1837, large lettering | 5,558,300 | |
| 1837 | Type of 1837, small lettering | 5,558,300 | |
| 1837 | Type of 1838 | 5,558,300 | |
| 1838 | – | 6,370,200 | |
| 1839 | Head of 1838 | 3,128,661 | |
| 1839 | Head of 1838, 9 over 6 error | 3,128,661 | |
| 1839 | "Silly Head" | 3,128,661 | |
| 1839 | "Booby Head" | 3,128,661 | |

=== Braided Hair varieties ===
Braided Hair varieties (1839–1857; 1868)
| Year | Variety | Mintage | Notes |
|---|---|---|---|
| 1839 | – | 3,128,661 | |
| 1840 | Small date | 2,462,700 | |
| 1840 | Large date | 2,462,700 | |
| 1840 | Small over large date error | 2,462,700 | |
| 1841 | – | 1,597,367 | |
| 1842 | Large date | 2,383,390 | |
| 1842 | Small date | 2,383,390 | |
| 1843 | Small head, small lettering | 2,425,342 | |
| 1843 | Small head, large lettering | 2,425,342 | |
| 1843 | Large head | 2,425,342 | |
| 1844 | Standard date | 2,398,752 | |
| 1844 | 44 over 81 error | 2,398,752 | In reality, the date was punched into the die upside-down, but was corrected by punching the date correctly |
| 1845 | – | 3,894,804 | |
| 1846 | Small date | 4,120,800 | |
| 1846 | Medium date | 4,120,800 | |
| 1846 | Tall date | 4,120,800 | |
| 1847 | Standard date | 6,183,669 | |
| 1847 | Large over small 47 | 6,183,669 | |
| 1848 | Standard date | 6,415,799 | |
| 1848 | Small date (counterfeit) | >10-12 | Although this coin is a counterfeit, many numismatists include this coin in coin catalogs |
| 1849 | – | 4,178,500 | |
| 1850 | – | 4,426,844 | |
| 1851 | Standard date | 9,889,707 | |
| 1851 | 51 over 81 | 9,889,707 | This error is similar to the 44 over 81 error, and inverted date was corrected by punching the date correctly into the die |
| 1852 | – | 5,063,094 | |
| 1853 | – | 6,641,131 | |
| 1854 | – | 4,236,156 | |
| 1855 | Upright 55 | 1,574,829 | |
| 1855 | Slanted 55 | 1,574,829 | |
| 1855 | Slanted 55, knob on ear | 1,574,829 | Error caused by a die break |
| 1856 | Upright 5 | 2,690,463 | |
| 1856 | Slanted 5 | 2,690,463 | |
| 1857 | Large date | 333,456 | |
| 1857 | Small date | 333,456 | |
| 1868 | Nickel | >7 | Pattern coins struck for collectors |
| 1868 | Copper | ≈12 | Pattern coins struck for collectors |

== Replacement ==
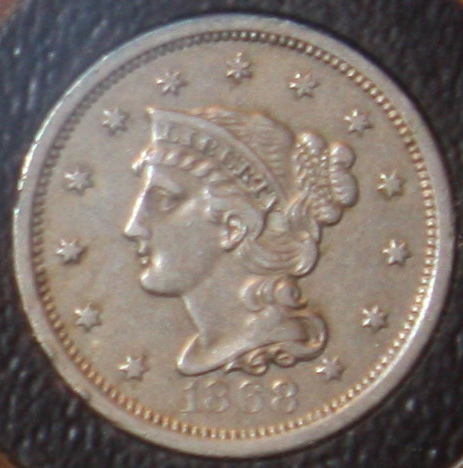
An 1868 dime pattern struck with the Coronet large cent obverse.

The price of copper rose dramatically in the late-1840s, and the cost of producing large cents rose as a result. The US Mint started seeking an alternative that used less copper. The first attempt was to perforate the coin, resulting in the ring cents of 1850 and 1851. The standard composition of these coins was billon, an alloy of 90% copper and 10% silver. This coin was not placed into production as it was expensive to extract the silver from the alloy, and the coins were difficult to eject from the dies. Additionally, a drop in the price of copper temporarily eliminated the need to replace the large cent.

The price of copper rose again in the mid-1850s, and the mint again looked for an alternative cent. This time, the cent was reduced in size, only a little larger than a dime. Patterns for the Flying Eagle cent were struck in 1854, and proved to be a suitable replacement for the large cent. The small cent was approved for production in 1856, and several thousand 1856 Flying Eagle cents were sold to collectors. Full-scale production commenced in mid-1857, replacing the large cent last struck earlier that year.

In 1868, eleven years after the last large cent was produced, a mint employee struck around a dozen and a half large cents dated 1868. These coins were struck in both copper and nickel planchets. Also produced that year were about 2 dozen dime patterns were minted in nickel with the obverse die of the 1868 large cent, plus an additional 2 dozen pieces struck in copper.

== See also ==
- Silver center cent
- Chain cent
- Wreath cent
- Liberty Cap large cent
- Draped Bust
- Indian Head cent
- Lincoln cent

| Preceded by Classic Head cent | United States one-cent coin (1816–1857) | Succeeded by Flying Eagle cent |
