= Half cent =

1793–1857 American coin worth 0.5 cents

- United States
- Value: 0.5 cents or 0.005 US dollars
- Diameter: 23.5 mm
- Thickness: 2 mm
- Edge: lettered (1793, 1797); plain (1794–1857); gripped (1797)
- Composition: 100% copper
- Years of minting: 1793–1857

Obverse
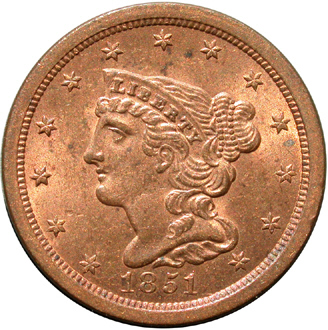
- Design: Lady Liberty with braided hair
- Designer: Christian Gobrecht
- Design date: 1840; 186 years ago

Reverse
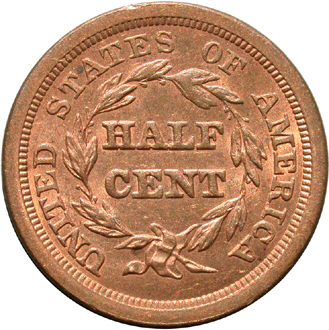
- Design: Denomination surrounded by a wreath
- Design date: 1840
- Design discontinued: 1857

The half cent was the smallest denomination of United States coin ever minted. It was first minted in 1793 and last minted in 1857. In that time, it had purchasing power equivalent to between 12¢ and 17¢ in 2025 values. It was minted with five different designs.

== History ==
First authorized by the Coinage Act of 1792, the coin was produced in the United States from 1793 to 1857. The half-cent piece was made of 100% copper and worth half of a cent, or one two-hundredth of a dollar (five milles). It was slightly smaller than a modern U.S. quarter with diameters 22 mm (1793), 23.5 mm (1794–1836), and 23 mm (1840–1857). They were all produced at the Philadelphia Mint.

The Coinage Act of 1857, discontinued the half-cent and the similar large cent, and authorized the small cent (Flying Eagle cent).

== Design varieties ==
Half cent types

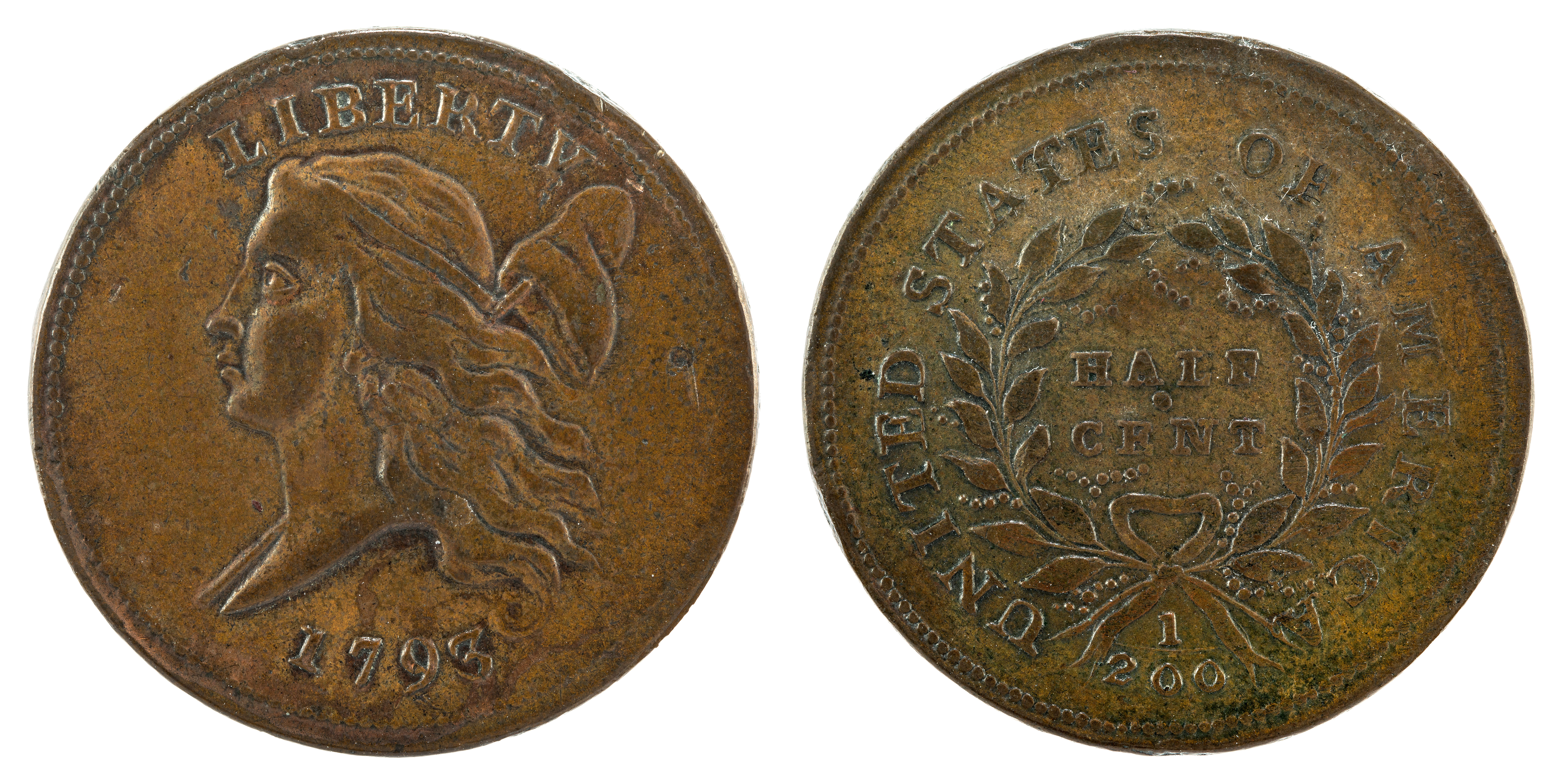
Liberty Cap (facing left)

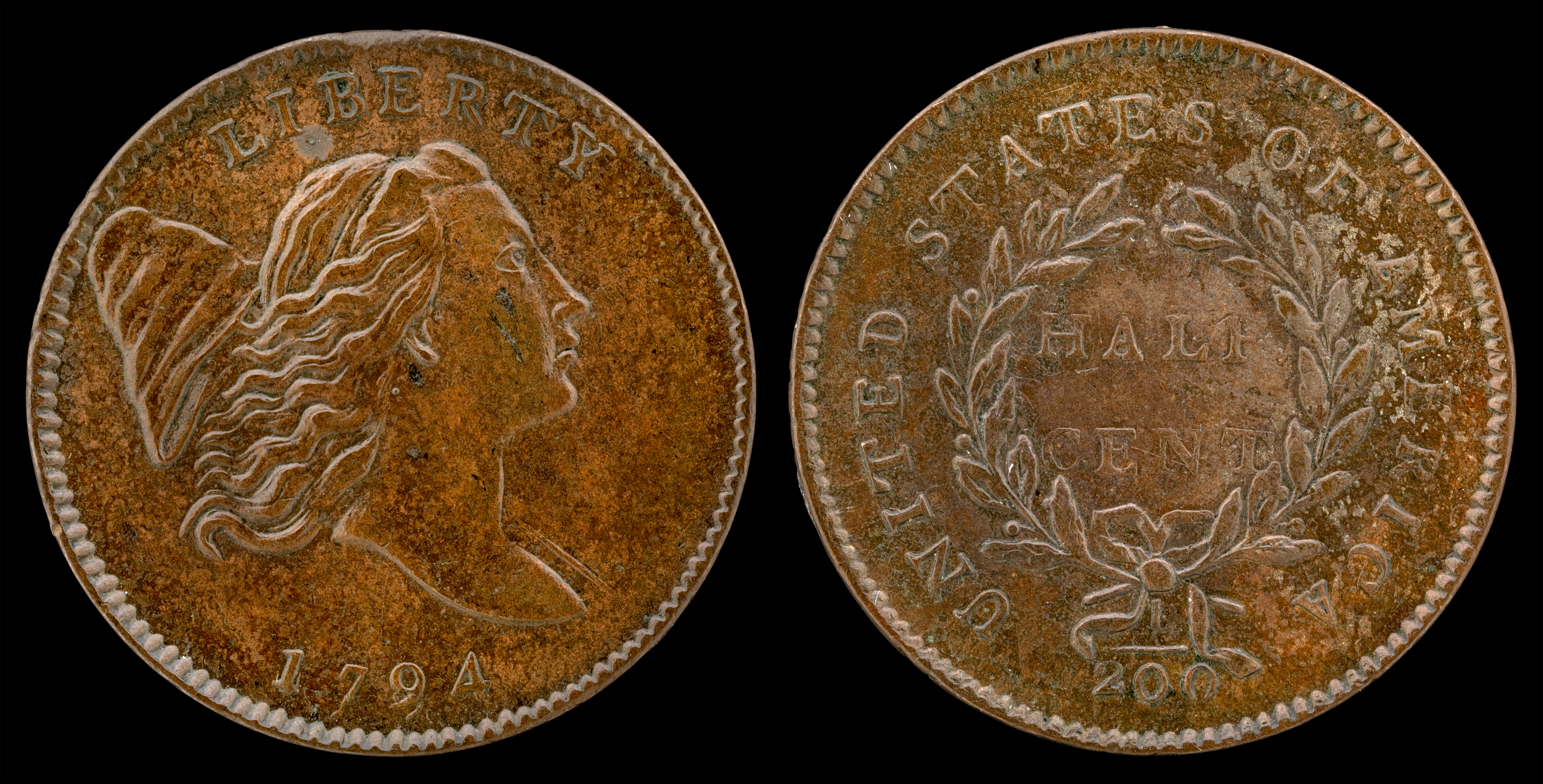
Liberty Cap (facing right)

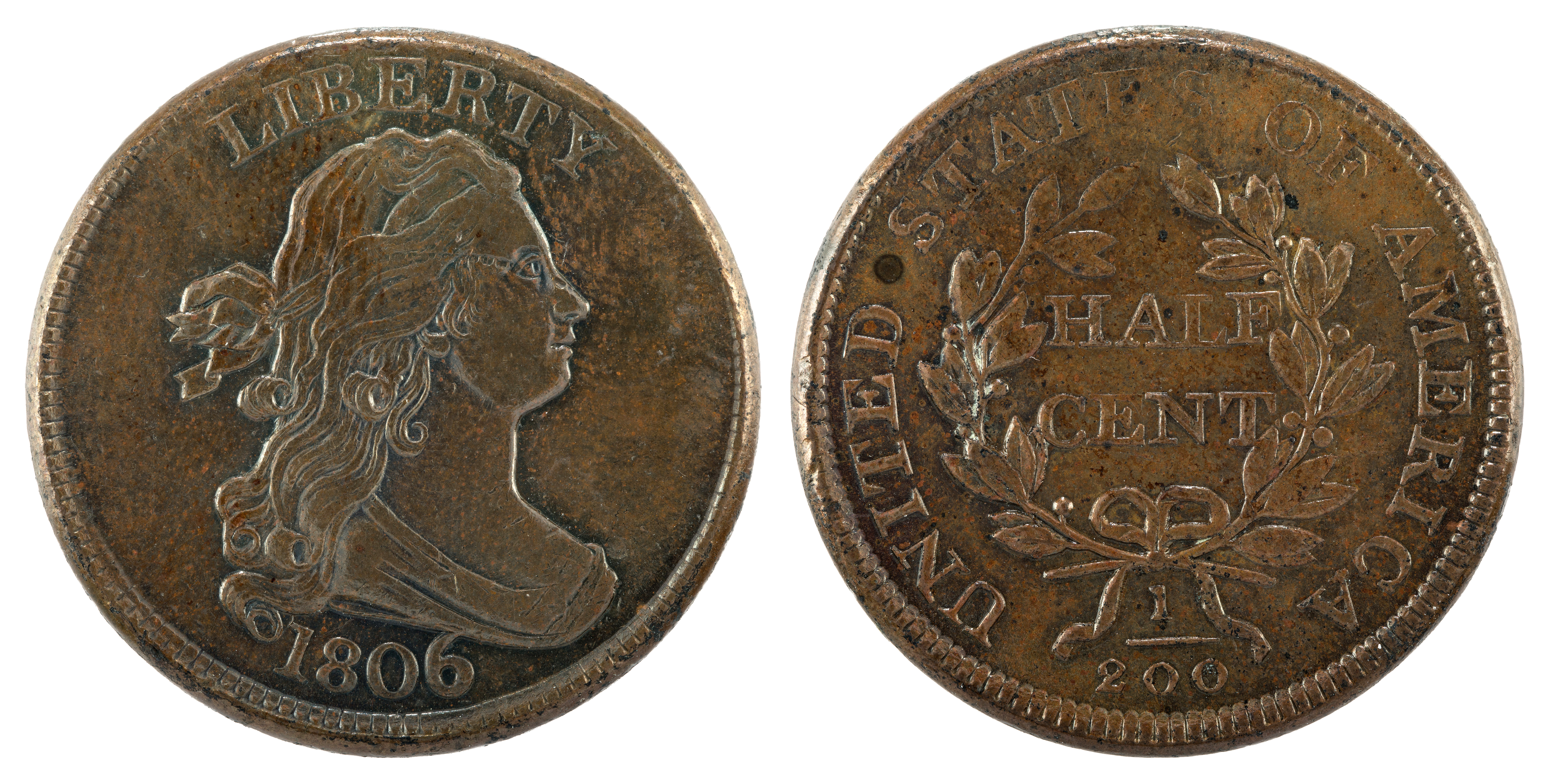
Draped Bust

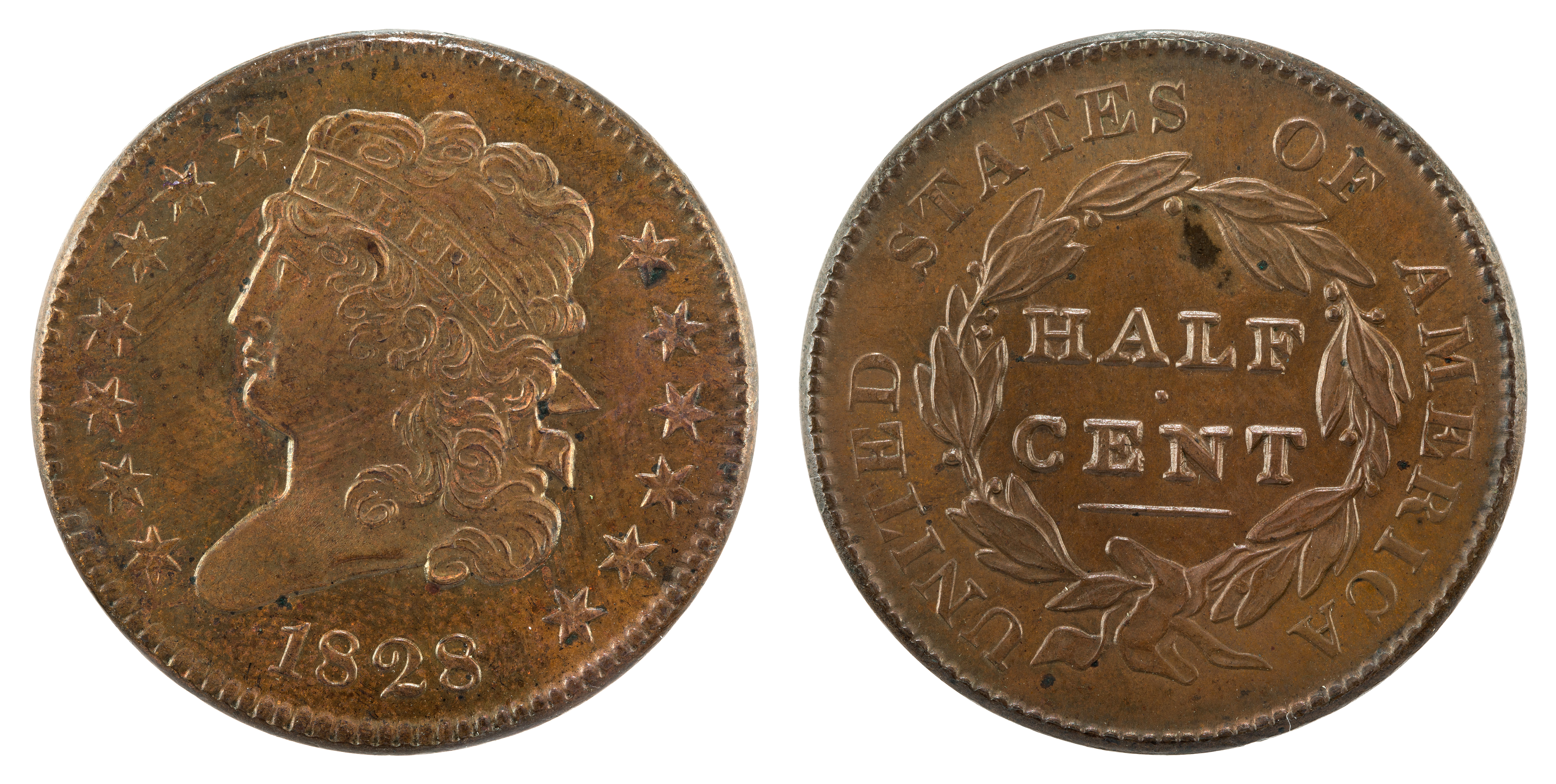
Classic Head

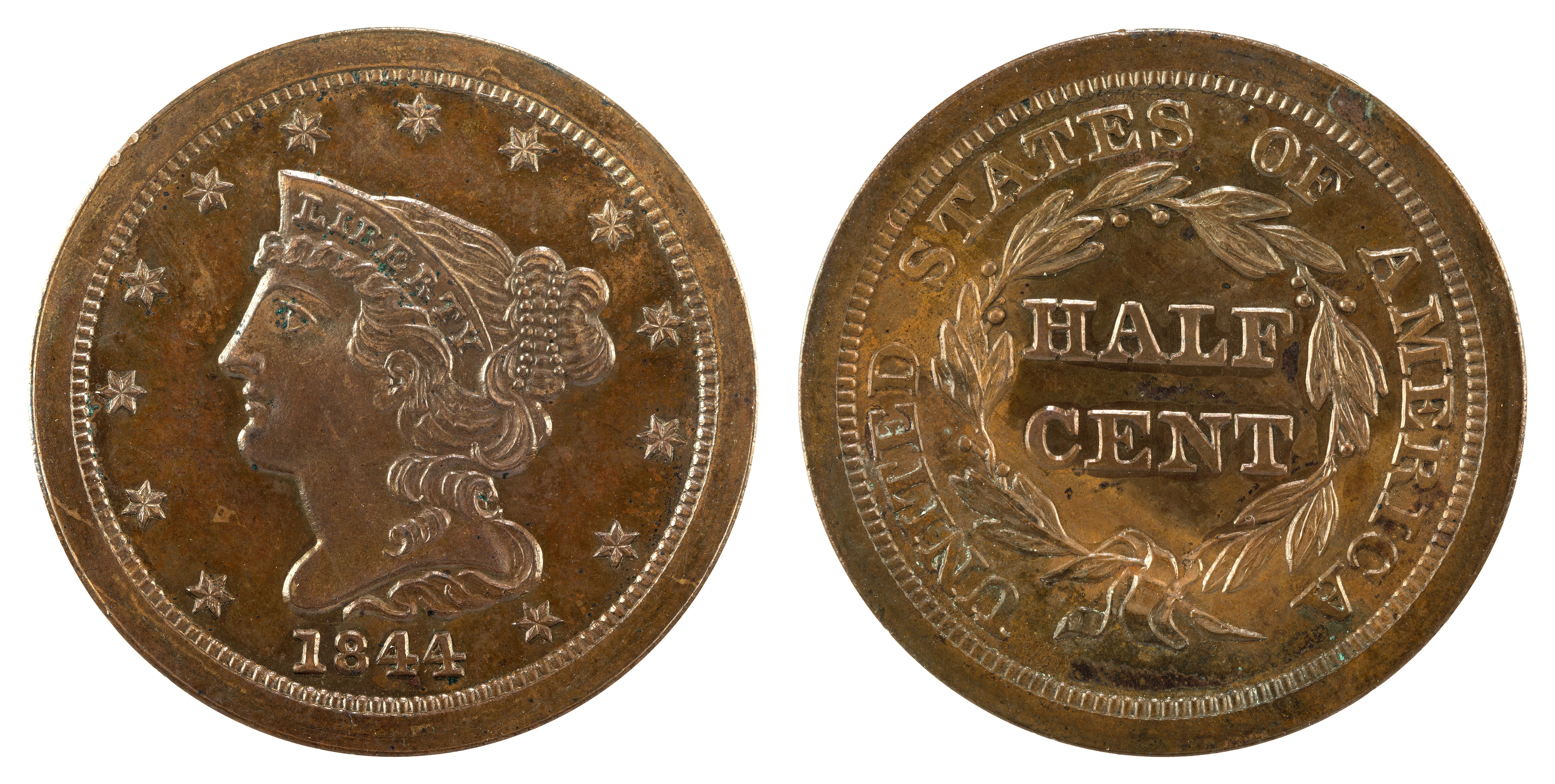
Braided Hair

There are several different types of half cents:

- Liberty Cap, Facing left (designed and engraved by Henry Voigt) – issued 1793
- Liberty Cap, Facing right (large head designed by Robert Scot, small head designed by Scot-John Gardner, engraved by Robert Scot) – issued 1794 to 1797
- Draped Bust (obverse designed by Gilbert Stuart and Robert Scot, reverse designed by Scot-John Gardner, engraved by Robert Scot) – issued 1800 to 1808
- Classic Head (designed and engraved by Robert Scot or John Reich) – issued 1809 to 1836
- Braided Hair (designed by Christian Gobrecht) – issued 1840 to 1857

There are no mint marks on any of the coins (all minted at the Philadelphia Mint) and the edges are plain on most half cents. On the 1793, 1794, and some 1795 coins and a variety of the 1797 coin, it was lettered TWO HUNDRED FOR A DOLLAR and another 1797 variety had a gripped, or milled, edge.

== Mintage figures ==
Liberty Cap, facing left

- 1793 – 35,334

Liberty Cap, facing right

- 1794 – 81,600
- 1795 – 139,690
- 1796 – 1,390
- 1797 – 127,840

Draped Bust

- 1800 – 202,908
- 1802 – 20,266
- 1803 – 92,000
- 1804 – 1,055,312
- 1805 – 814,464
- 1806 – 356,000
- 1807 – 476,000
- 1808 – 400,000

Classic Head (Shown at top right)

- 1809 – 1,154,572
- 1810 – 215,000
- 1811 – 63,140
- 1825 – 63,000
- 1826 – 234,000
- 1828 – 606,000
- 1829 – 487,000
- 1831 – 2,200
- 1832 – 51,000
- 1833 – 103,000
- 1834 – 141,000
- 1835 – 398,000
- 1836 – proof only, restrikes were made
- 1837 – No half cents were struck by the United States government; however, due to the need for small change, half-cent tokens were produced by private businessmen.

Braided Hair

- 1840 through 1849 were proof-only issues. There were restrikes made.
- 1849 – 39,864
- 1850 – 39,812
- 1851 – 147,672
- 1852 – proof only. Restrikes were made.
- 1853 – 129,694
- 1854 – 55,358
- 1855 – 56,500
- 1856 – 40,430
- 1857 – 35,180

== See also ==
- Penny (United States coin), the second smallest denomination of United States coin minted
- Philippine half-centavo coin, similar denomination issued for the U.S. territory

== Sources ==
- Yeoman, R.S. (2014). Bressett, Kenneth (ed.). A Guide Book of United States Coins 2015 (68th ed.). Atlanta, Georgia: Whitman Publishing. ISBN 978-079484215-4. OCLC 875521690. OL 28306197M.
- The Half Cent Die State Book 1793–1857 by Ronald P. Manley, Ph.D., 1998.
- American Half Cents – The "Little Half Sisters" (Second Edition) by Roger S. Cohen Jr., 1982.
- Walter Breen's Encyclopedia of United States Half Cents 1793–1857 by Walter Breen, 1983.
- The Half Cent, 1793–1857 The Story of American's Greatest Little Coin by William R. Eckberg, 2019
- The Half Cent Handbook – Draped Bust Varieties 1800–1808 by Ed Fuhrman, 2020.
- The Half Cent Handbook – Classic Head & Braided Hair Varieties by Ed Fuhrman, 2021.
- The Half Cent Handbook – Liberty Cap Varieties 1793–1797 by Ed Fuhrman, 2022.
- The Half Cent Handbook – Errors and Oddities by Ed Fuhrman, 2022.
- The Half Cent Handbook – Ultimate Grading Guide by Ed Fuhrman, 2023.
- The Half Cent Handbook – Ultimate Attribution Guide by Ed Fuhrman, 2023.
