= Braided hair (disambiguation) =

Braided hair is hair that has been tied into braids. Braided hair may also refer to:

- "Braided Hair", a kind of Coronet large cent
- "Braided Hair", a song from the 2002 1 Giant Leap album 1 Giant Leap
