= Turban Head eagle =

US ten-dollar gold piece (1795–1804)

- United States
- Value: 10 US dollars
- Mass: 17.50 g
- Diameter: 33 mm
- Edge: reeded
- Composition: .9167 gold, .0833 silver and copper
- Years of minting: 1795–1804

Obverse
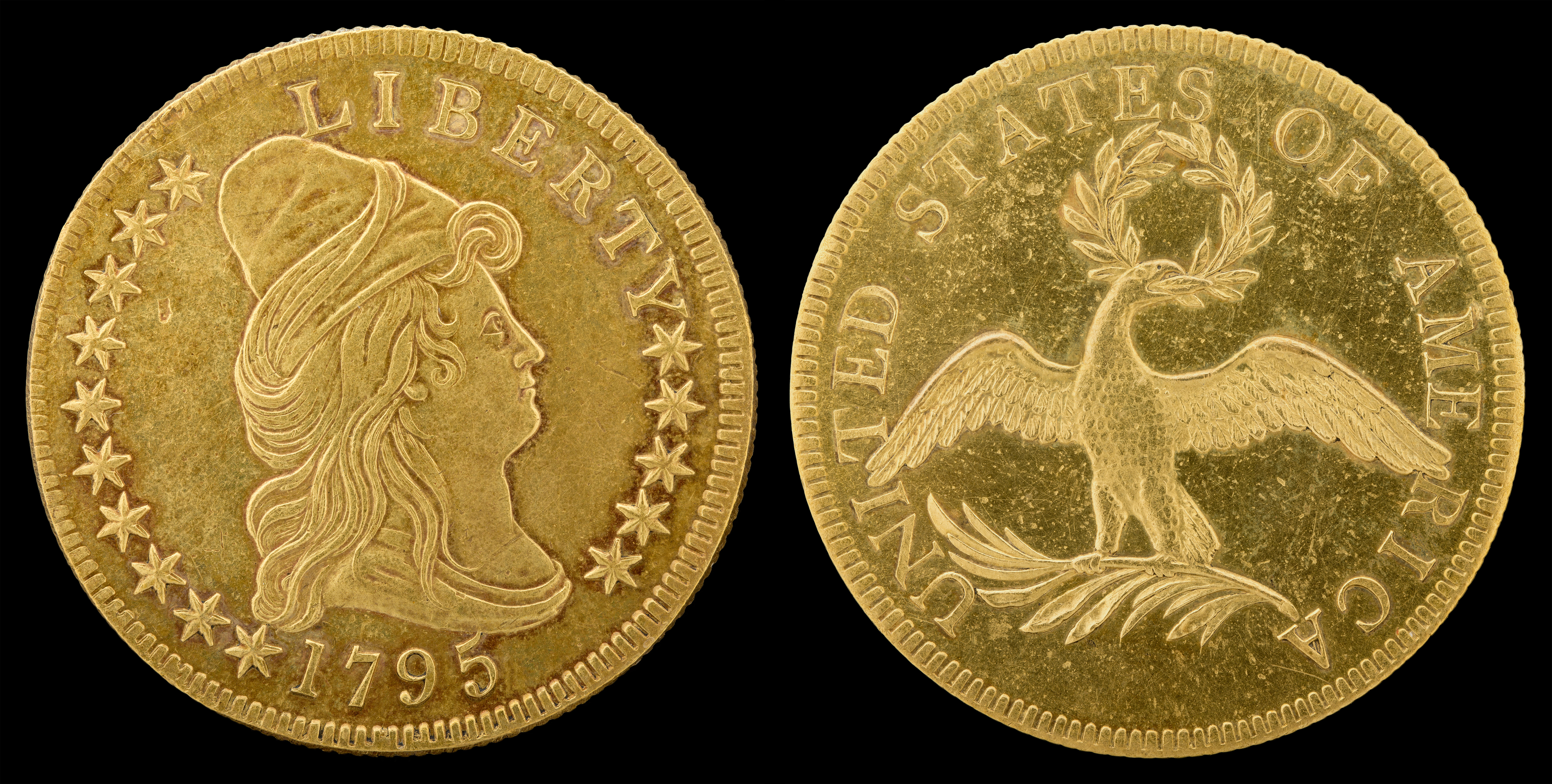
- Design: Liberty wearing a cap
- Designer: Robert Scot
- Design date: 1795–1804

Reverse
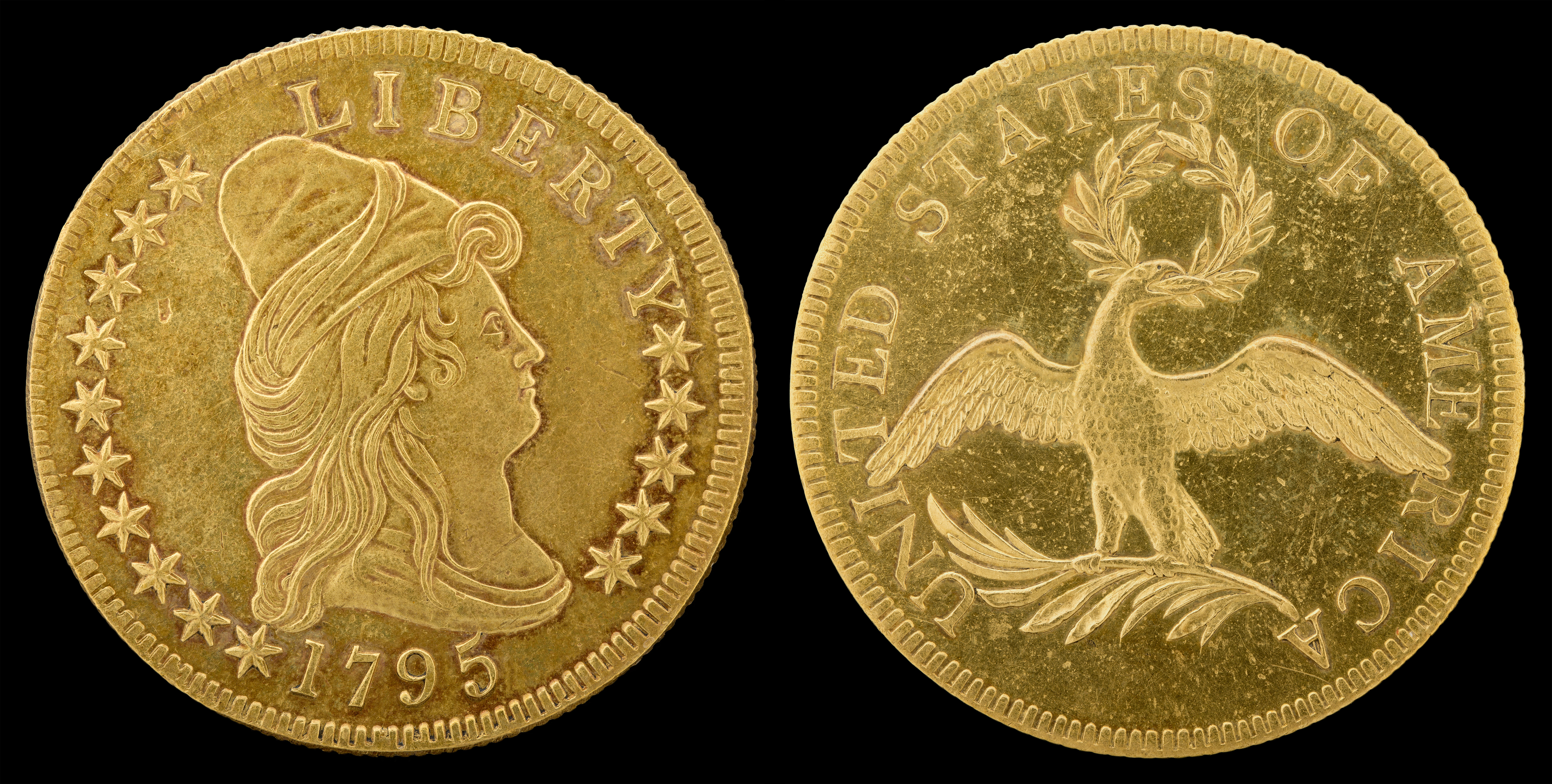
- Design: Eagle standing on a branch, holding wreath in mouth
- Designer: Robert Scot
- Design date: 1795–1797
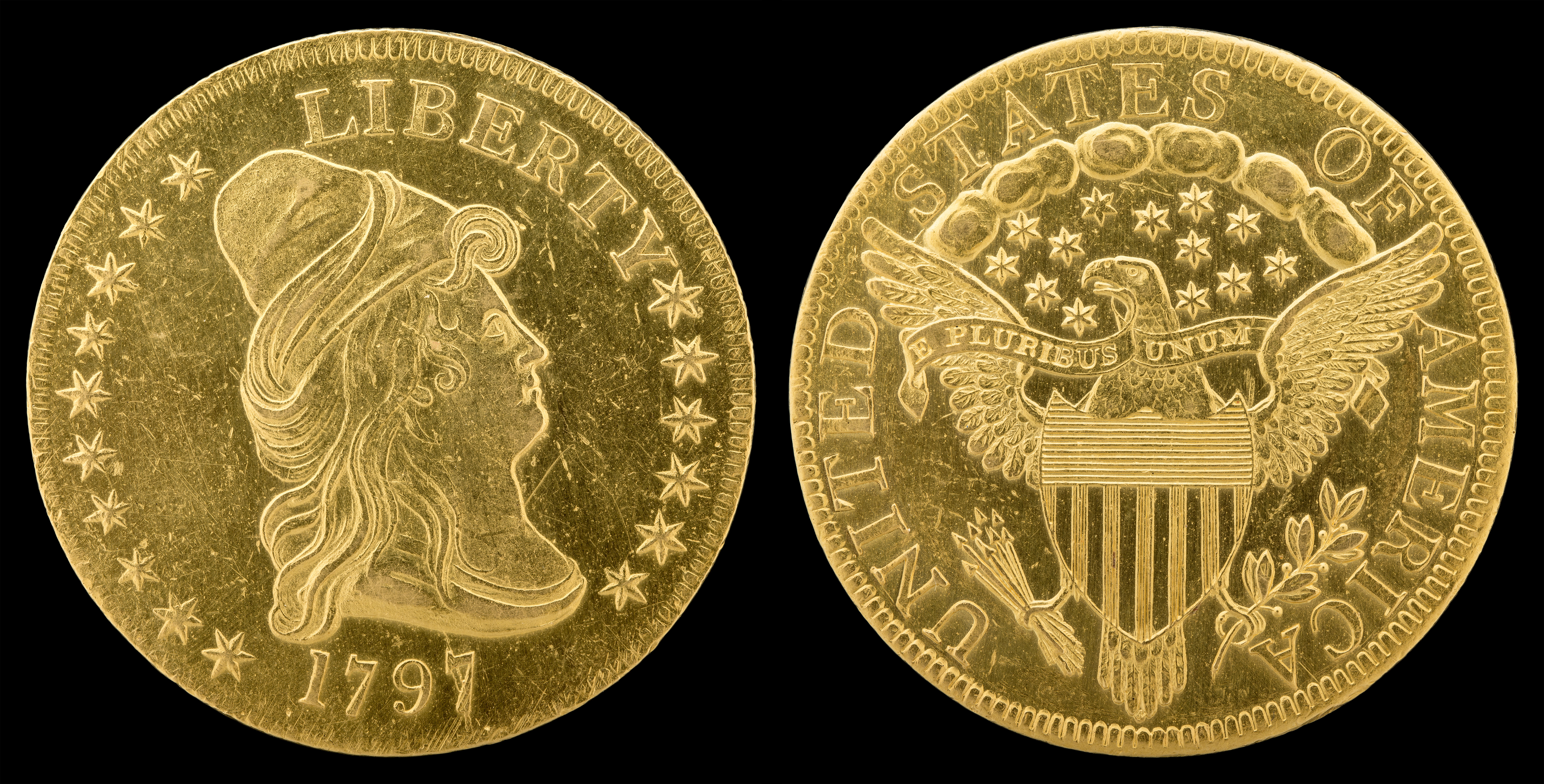
- Design: Heraldic style eagle, based on Great Seal of the United States
- Designer: Robert Scot
- Design date: 1797–1804

The Turban Head eagle, also known as the Capped Bust eagle, was a ten-dollar gold piece, or eagle, struck by the United States Mint from 1795 to 1804. The piece was designed by Robert Scot, and was the first in the eagle series, which continued until the Mint ceased striking gold coins for circulation in 1933. The common name is a misnomer; Liberty does not wear a turban but a cap, believed by some to be a pileus or Phrygian cap (Liberty cap): her hair twisting around the headgear makes it resemble a turban.

The eagle was the largest denomination authorized by the Mint Act of 1792, which established the Bureau of the Mint. It was not struck until 1795, as the Mint at first struck copper and silver coins. The number of stars on the obverse was initially intended to be equal to the number of states in the Union, but with the number at 16, that idea was abandoned in favor of using 13 stars in honor of the original states. The initial reverse, featuring an eagle with a wreath in its mouth, proved unpopular and was replaced by a heraldic eagle.

Increases in the price of gold made it profitable for the coins to be melted for their precious metal content, and in 1804, President Thomas Jefferson ended coinage of eagles; the denomination was not struck again for circulation for more than thirty years. Four 1804-dated eagles were struck in 1834 for inclusion in sets of US coins to be given to foreign potentates. These 1804 "Plain 4" coins differ from the eagles actually struck in 1804 in the way the "4" in the date is styled, and are among the most valuable US coins.

== Inception ==
In 1791, Congress passed a resolution authorizing President George Washington to establish a mint. Feeling that the resolution was inadequate, President Washington asked legislators to pass a comprehensive law which would govern the new facility. The result was the Mint Act of 1792, which prescribed the specifications of the new US coins, the highest denomination being the eagle, or ten-dollar piece.

The passage of the Mint Act was followed by the establishment in Philadelphia of the Mint, which by 1793 was striking cents and half cents. Coinage of precious metal pieces was delayed; Congress had required that the assayer and chief coiner each post a security bond of $10,000, (Note: equivalent to $240,720 in 2025 adjusted for inflation) a huge sum in those days. In 1794, Congress lowered the chief coiner's bond to $5,000 (Note: equivalent to $108,506 in 2025 adjusted for inflation) and the assayer's to $1,000, (Note: equivalent to $21,701 in 2025 adjusted for inflation) and President Washington's appointees to those positions were able to qualify and take office. Silver coinage began that year.

The first deposit of gold to be struck into coins was made at the Mint in February 1795, by Moses Brown of Boston. Around May 1795, the first Mint director, David Rittenhouse, set engraver Robert Scot the task of preparing dies for an issue of gold coins. Rittenhouse resigned in June, before the work came to fruition, and was replaced by Henry deSaussure. The new director took office on July 9, 1795, and pressed to have the gold coin project completed with great speed. DeSaussure also publicized that the Mint would be striking gold pieces, the new nation's first; the first half eagles (five-dollar pieces) were struck 22 days later. Dies for the eagle coinage were prepared, most likely by Scot and by long-time Mint employee Adam Eckfeldt.

== Design ==
The three designs for the Turban Head eagle—the obverse and the two reverses—are all by Scot. They are identical to designs used on other silver and gold coins of the period—the Mint did not yet put denominations on gold pieces. The origin of Scot's obverse is uncertain. Art historian Cornelius Vermeule suggests a similarity between Scot's portrayal of Liberty on the eagle and the portrait on the 1792 half disme (deemed by some the first Federal coinage), and speculates that the ultimate inspiration may have been Martha Washington, the President's wife. He also contends that a bust should have drapery only if intended as part of a statue: "Greco-Roman classicism has been misunderstood here". Numismatic historian Walter Breen believes that Scot probably "copied some unlocated contemporaneous engraving of a Roman copy of a Hellenistic goddess, altering the hair, adding drapery and an oversize soft cap". Breen disputes Vermeule's contention that the cap is a pileus, the hat given to emancipated slaves as a symbol of their freedom. In support of his argument, he reproduces an 1825 letter from then Mint Director Samuel Moore, stating that the cap on the gold coins was "not the Liberty cap in form, but probably conforming to the fashionable dress of the day". Numismatic author David Lange contends the headgear is a mob cap, much in fashion at the time.

The reverse that appeared on the eagle from 1795 to mid-1797 depicts an eagle clutching a victory wreath, perched on a branch and surrounded by the nation's name. Vermeule contends that the appearance of the bird is "difficult to describe" but that it has "a healthy individuality and an almost-rustic charm". Breen suggests that the branch is from a palm tree, and that this is in tribute to deSaussure, a South Carolinian. The reverse coined from 1797 featured a heraldic eagle based on the Great Seal of the United States. Breen points to what he deems a blunder on Scot's part: the bird holds arrows and an olive branch, but carries the arrows in the dexter, or dominant right claw, symbolizing a preference for war over peace.

== Production ==
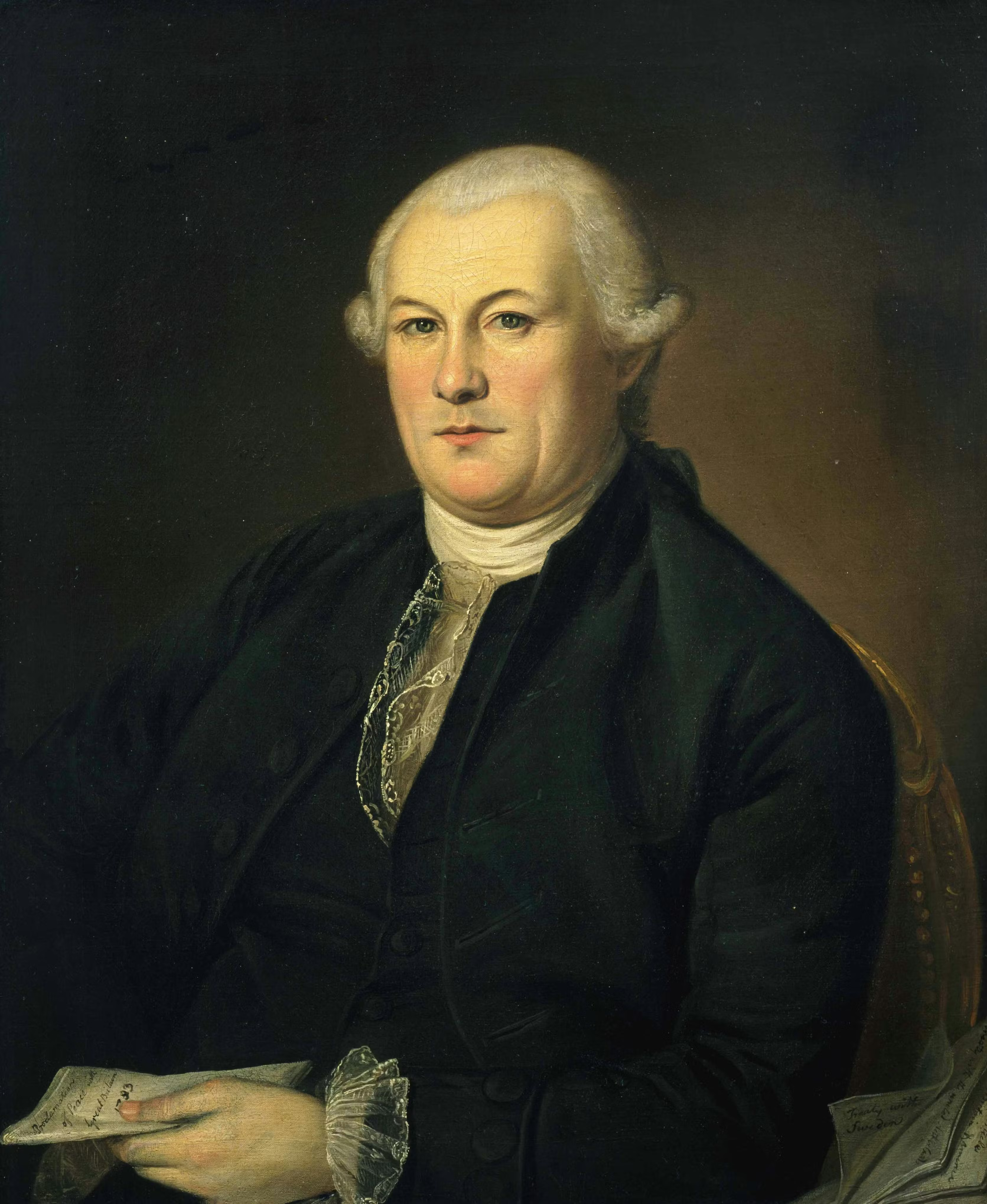
Mint Director Elias Boudinot had Mint Engraver Scot redesign the reverse of the Turban Head eagle.

Coinage of eagles followed shortly after production of half eagles began, although the exact date is uncertain. The first group produced is believed to have been struck in August and September 1795; 1,097 eagles were made available for circulation on September 22. Four hundred of these were immediately paid out to the Bank of Pennsylvania, which had deposited gold at the Mint for striking into eagles. One piece was put aside for the Mint's coin collection by Eckfeldt.

Numismatic author Dean Albanese considers the legend that Washington provided the gold for the first 400 eagles to be improbable; holding $4,000 in coin would have tied up much of Washington's capital in unproductive cash. Albanese suggests that as many surviving 1795 eagles are found with little wear, Washington may have had the government purchase pieces to give to dignitaries. By some reports, one eagle was presented to Washington, though whether it was from this first coinage is uncertain.

In the 1790s, the production of coin dies was difficult, expensive, and time-consuming. Mechanical reproduction of such dies was not yet possible; accordingly, coins of the same year struck from different dies can be distinguished from each other. Dies still in use at the end of the year often saw continued use, sometimes with the date re-engraved. These different dies are reflected in significant varieties today: some 1795 eagles have 13 leaves on the palm branch, others only nine.

Minting of eagles was interrupted in late 1795 because of the death of the Assayer to the United States Mint, Albion Cox. At that time, the Mint used unpowered screw presses to strike coins: striking such large coins using muscle power was difficult, and few Turban Head eagles show the entire design strongly. At the end of 1795, the Mint had 176 eagles on hand; coinage resumed (with 1795-dated dies) in late March 1796, after most of the stock on hand had been paid out.

As the half eagle approximated the size of a number of foreign gold coins, such as the British guinea and the French louis d'or, it was accepted readily in international commerce and was of a suitable value for many business transactions. DeSaussure is believed to have struck half eagles first for that reason, after consultation with bank officials. The eagle lacked such equivalents, was too high in value for many transactions, and rapidly became unpopular.

The eagles originally had 15 stars on the obverse, representing the fifteen states as of 1795. With the admission of Tennessee as a state in 1796, a sixteenth star was added to the obverse. The first 1796 eagles were delivered by the Mint on June 2, the day after Tennessee's admission. Breen notes that as Tennessee's statehood had been uncertain owing to opposition in Congress until shortly before the actual admission, the 16-star eagles most likely were not prepared until just before it became a state on June 1. Other 1796 coins, with smaller denominations, are known to have been struck on polished blanks for presentation in connection with the statehood celebrations; it is likely eagles were struck in this way as well. With the possibility of additional states being added to the Union in years to come, Mint officials decided to have the obverse feature only 13 stars, representing the original states of the Union. The Mint's coinage was decreased due to yellow fever epidemics in Philadelphia in 1796, 1797, 1801, and 1803; it struck fewer eagles in those four years, giving priority to more popular coins.

The public disliked Scot's original reverse design, deeming the depicted eagle scrawny and unworthy of a great nation such as the United States aspired to be. The new Mint director, Elias Boudinot, asked Scot to redesign the reverse. The so-called Heraldic Eagle design was struck on quarter eagles as early as 1796, but did not appear on the eagle until the following year, with the other gold denomination, the half eagle, following in 1798. The initial design (dubbed by some the "Plain Eagle") had been struck in relatively small numbers, 13,344 over the design's three-year life.

Some 1797 dies were re-engraved with an 8 over the final 7 (catalogued as 1798/7), to allow them to bear the year of issue; coins struck from them are the only 1798-dated eagles. Nevertheless, unaltered 1797 dies were used even after the 1798/7 pieces; this can be shown because the same reverse die was used for both issues, and on the 1797-dated pieces, the reverse die displays greater wear. All 1798 and later eagles have only 13 stars on the obverse, however some 1798/7 eagles have nine stars on the left and four on the right, while others have seven on the left and six on the right. Only 2,000 pieces were struck in 1798, but the following year demand for the eagle surged, and over 37,000 were struck.

The precious metal composition of US coins was calculated such that gold would be fifteen times as valuable per ounce as silver. By the turn of the 19th century, the price of gold in terms of silver had risen to approximately 15.75 to one. This made it profitable for merchants to buy gold coins at face value using silver coins, and export the gold to Europe. Gold vanished from circulation in the United States by 1800. By 1801, almost no bullion was being deposited at the Mint, causing the Jefferson administration to consider its closure. The eagle was especially desired by exporters, as the larger size and value made it more convenient to handle. Although the Mint remained open, on December 31, 1804, President Thomas Jefferson ordered that eagles and silver dollars no longer be struck, ending the Turban Head eagle series. Coin dealer and author Q. David Bowers suggests that while a majority of eagles remained in the United States, enough were exported to make continuing their mintage an exercise in futility.

Coinage of eagles did not resume until 1838 (after Congress decreased the gold content of American coins, eliminating the incentive to export them), when a new design, by Christian Gobrecht, was struck.

== 1804 issues ==
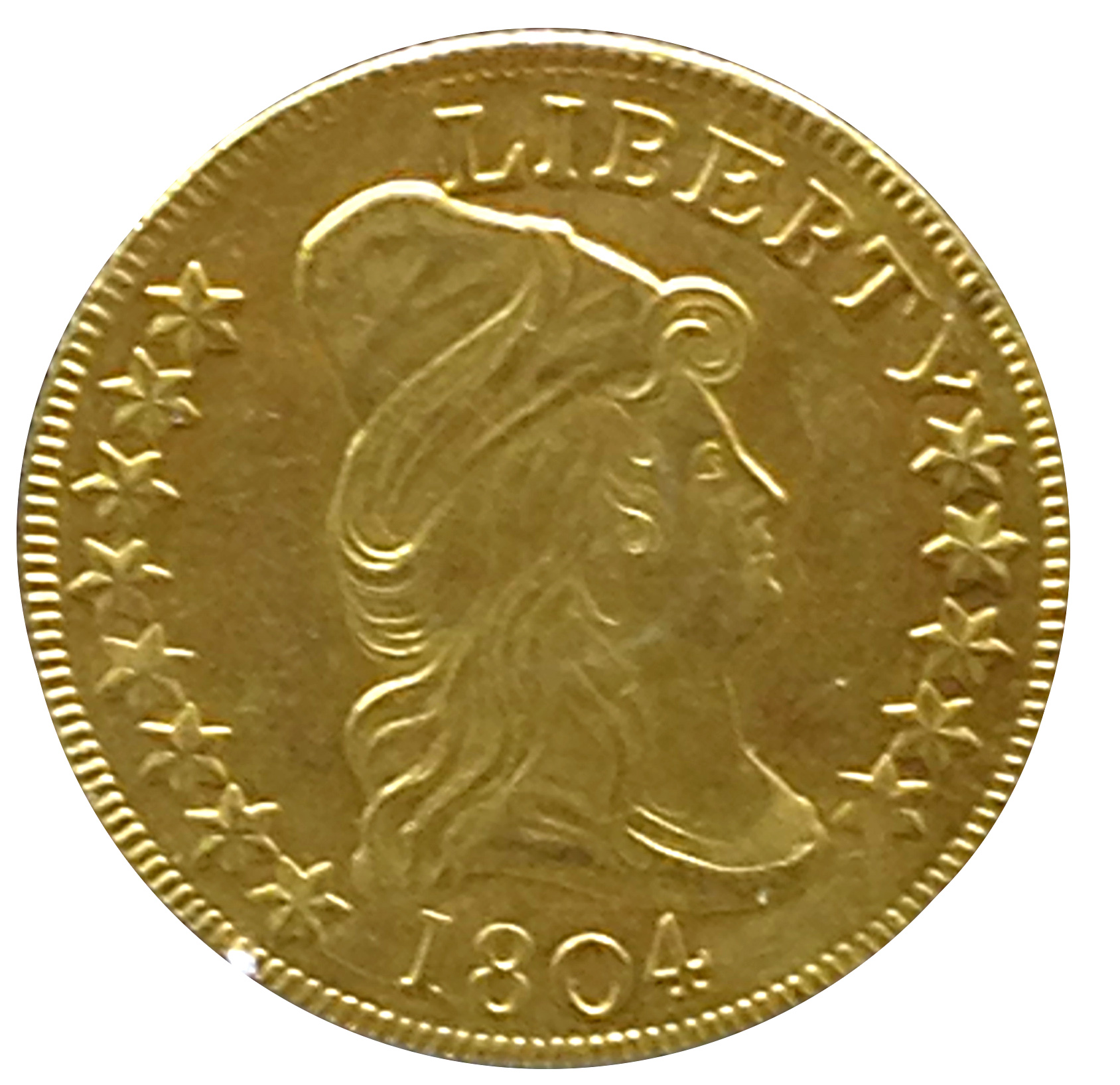
1804 Crosslet 4 eagle

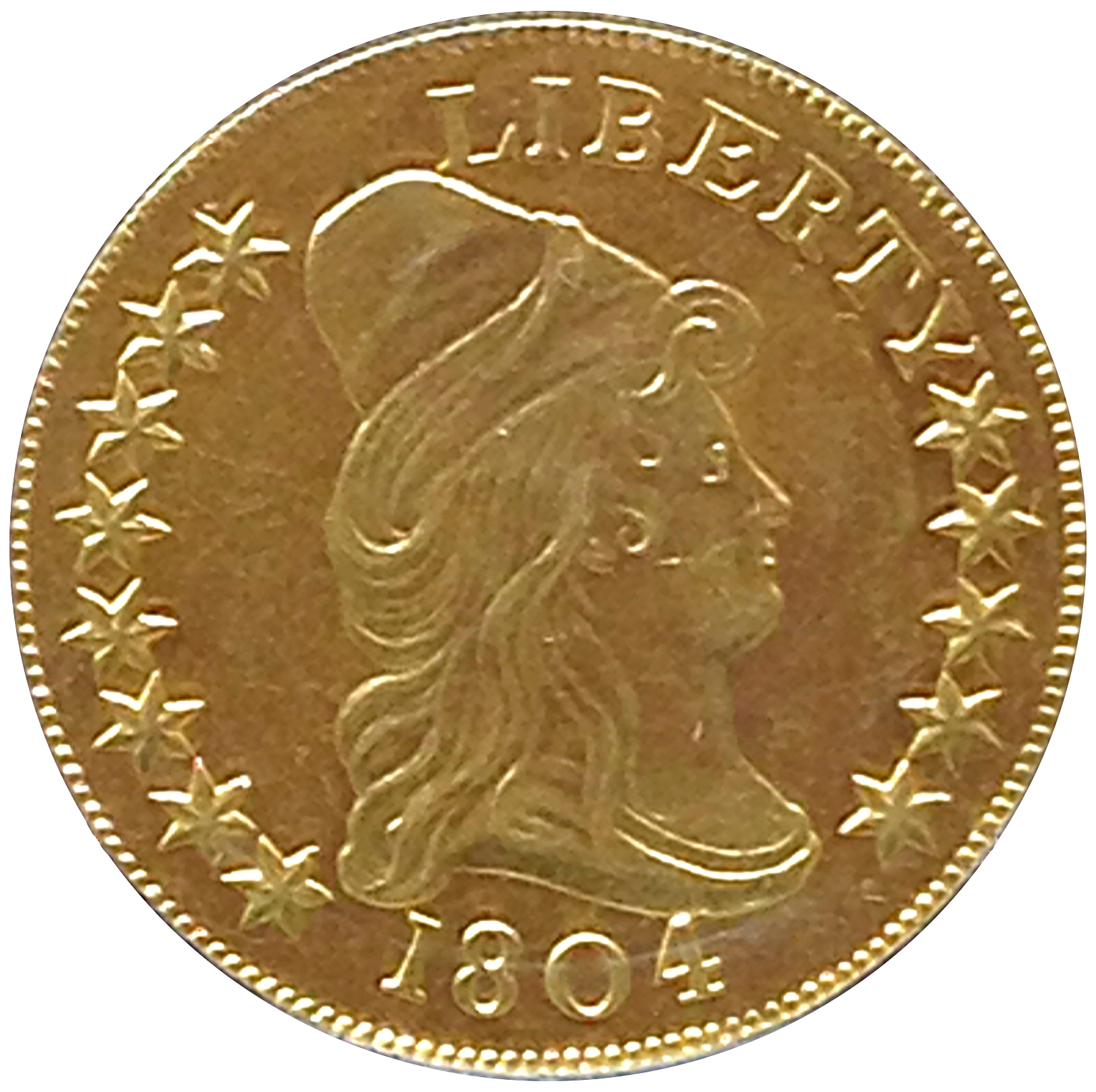
1804 Plain 4 eagle, the only one on public display

Although the Mint coined 1803-dated eagles in 1804, a total of 3,757 eagles dated 1804 were struck in that year. These pieces, dubbed the "Crosslet 4" variety (Plain 4 eagles have a short projection of the cross-stroke of the 4 extending to the right of the upright, Crosslet 4 have short vertical extensions of the cross-stroke at the end of the projection), were extensively melted at the time, and the few known today are very collectible. R.S. Yeoman, in his "Red Book" valuing US coins published during 2012, values the Crosslet 4 at $125,000 (Note: equivalent to $175,297 in 2025 adjusted for inflation) in MS-63 ranging down to $55,000 (Note: equivalent to $77,131 in 2025 adjusted for inflation) in more circulated, Almost Uncirculated-50 condition. Many surviving Turban Head eagles were sold by exchange agents to coin dealers or collectors in the 1850s and afterwards as the hobby became more popular and the pieces acquired a modest premium over their melt value.

In 1834, the United States Government intended to present a set of then-current US coins to four Asian rulers the US had either made agreements with or else hoped to treat with. Neither the silver dollar nor the eagle had been struck since 1804, but they were still considered current coins. Putting the date of striking on the pieces would make them appear to be in violation of Jefferson's prohibition which remained in force. Mint Director Moore decided to strike 1804-dated dollars and eagles for the sets, and four 1804 eagles were struck. They differ from the pieces struck thirty years earlier, lacking a crosslet on the right side of the crossbar of the 4. Two were presented, to the Sultan of Muscat and the King of Siam, before the diplomat in charge of the expedition, Edmund Roberts, died of disease in Macao, and his mission was abandoned. The remaining two sets were returned to the United States.

The existence of the Plain 4 pieces was revealed in 1869, when one was reproduced in the American Journal of Numismatics. The significance and history of the pieces was at first unrecognized, and the revelation prompted no particular excitement. How the pieces returned to US authorities came to be dispersed is unknown. The set given to the King of Siam was sold at auction by descendants of Anna Leonowens, who served as schoolteacher to the children of King Mongkut of Siam in the 1860s, although how it came into her possession is uncertain. As of 2009, three of the pieces were in private collections, the fourth is in the Harry W. Bass, Jr. Collection, displayed in the Money Museum of the American Numismatic Association in Colorado Springs, Colorado. The Siam set has sold for $8.5 million. From his experience of many years as a coin dealer, Albanese believes that the eagle in that set is not the original, but another of the four 1804 Plain 4 eagles, purchased to replace one sold to a collector.
