= Liberty Cap large cent =

U.S. Mint one-cent coin (1793–1796)

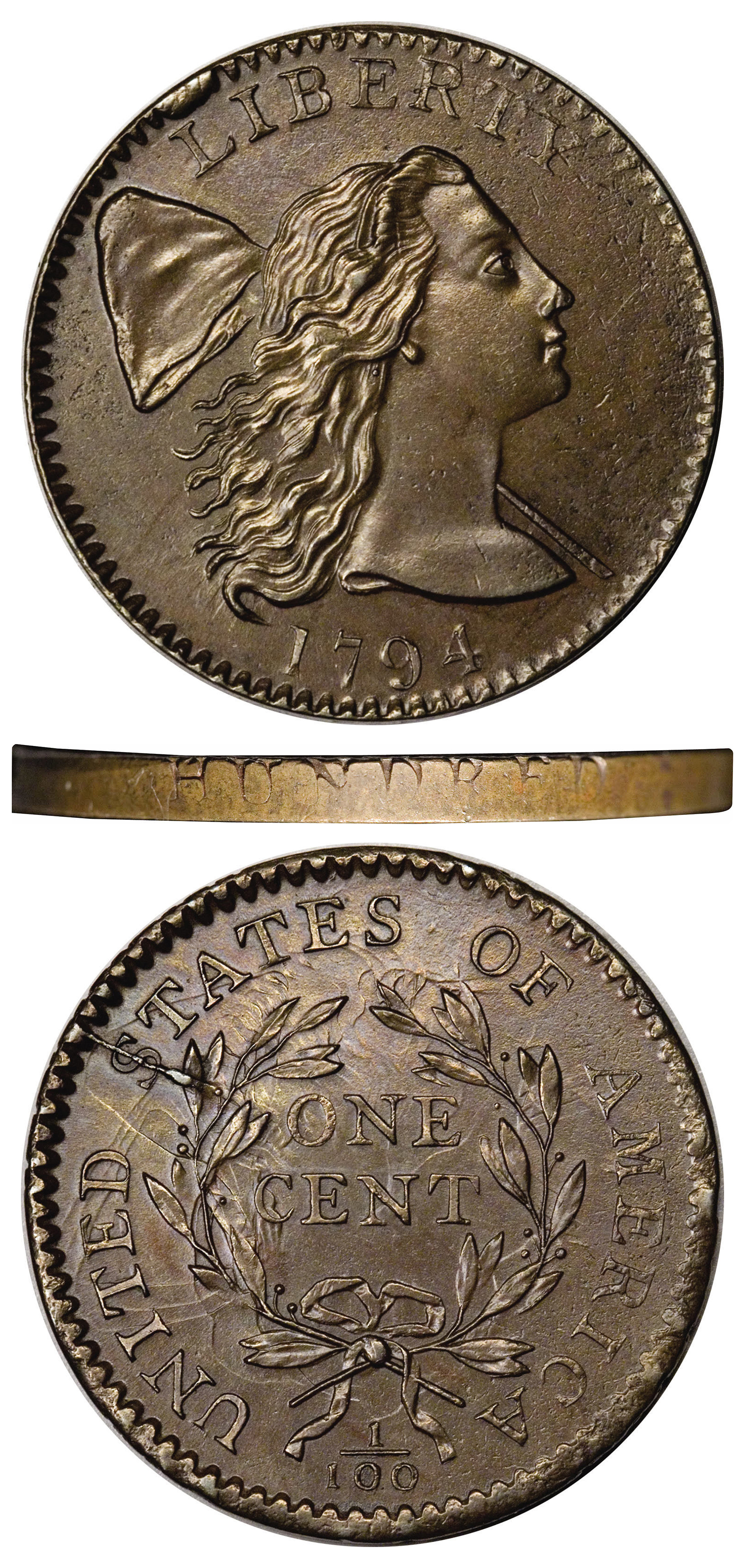
A 1794 Liberty Cap large cent, as well as a portion of its lettered edge

The Liberty Cap large cent was a type of large cent struck by the United States Mint from 1793 until 1796, when it was replaced by the Draped Bust large cent. The coin features an image of the goddess of Liberty and her accompanying Phrygian cap.

== History ==
The Liberty Cap large cent, designed by Joseph Wright, was issued by the Mint from 1793 to 1796. The Mint created this type of cent in an attempt to satisfy the public objections to the Chain cent and Wreath cent. It appears to have been a little more successful than its precedents, as it was continued into 1796, unlike the previous two issues, which were each issued for less than a year. In 1795, the planchets became too thin for the use of edge lettering on the coins, so coins from late-1795 onward have no edge lettering.

The Liberty Cap half cent was designed not by Wright, however, but by Chief Engraver of the United States Mint, Robert Scot.

== Varieties ==
Due to the differences in individual dies used in the coin dies used to produce these coins, there are over one hundred known varieties for the series. Some of these include the variable shapes of the head or differences in the size and shape of the numbers in the date. Some of these varieties greatly influences the value of the coin for collectors.

| Preceded by Wreath cent | United States one-cent coin (1793–1796) | Succeeded by Draped Bust cent |
