= Liberty Cap half cent =

First half cents produced by the United States Mint

- United States
- Value: 0.005 US Dollar
- Mass: 1793–1795; 6.74 g 1796–1797; 5.44 g
- Diameter: 23.5 mm
- Edge: plain, lettered, or gripped
- Composition: pure copper
- Years of minting: 1793–1797

Obverse
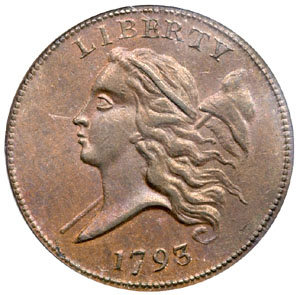
- Design: Liberty, facing left, with a Liberty cap on a pole behind her
- Designer: Unknown (possibly Henry Voigt, Joseph Wright, or Adam Eckfeldt)
- Design date: 1793
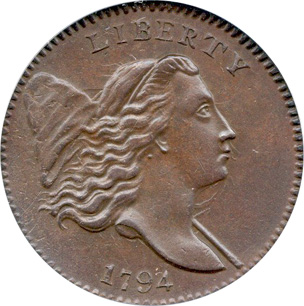
- Design: Liberty, facing right, with a Liberty cap on a pole behind her
- Designer: Robert Scot
- Design date: 1794

Reverse
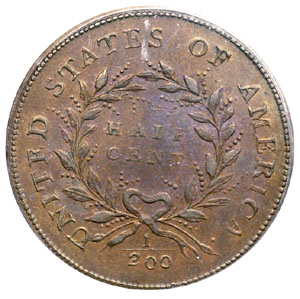
- Design: Wreath with strings of berries
- Designer: Unknown
- Design date: 1793
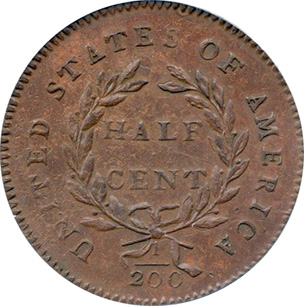
- Design: Wreath with single berries
- Designer: Unknown
- Design date: 1794

The Liberty Cap half cent was the first half cent coin produced by the United States Mint. It was issued from 1793 until 1797.

== History ==
The Liberty Cap half cent was among the first coins produced by the Philadelphia Mint, with the only other coins produced by the Mint in 1793 were the Chain, Wreath, and Liberty Cap large cents. Production of the half cent was temporarily suspended in 1797, but resumed in 1800 with a new design.

== Design ==
The obverse of the Liberty Cap half cent originally featured a bust of Liberty facing left, with flowing hair and a Liberty cap on a pole behind her. In 1794, the design was flipped so that Liberty faced right.

The reverse featured a wreath that was similar to that of the Wreath cent.

=== Designers ===
The 1793 half cent was engraved by Henry Voigt, although it is not known if he was the original designer. The "Liberty facing right" coins were designed and engraved by Robert Scot.
