= Classic Head =

19th-century American coin design

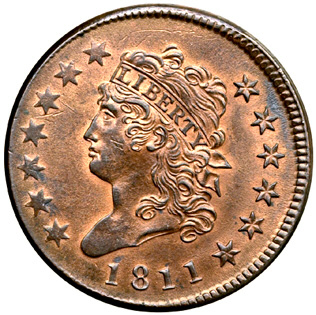
An 1811 Classic Head large cent

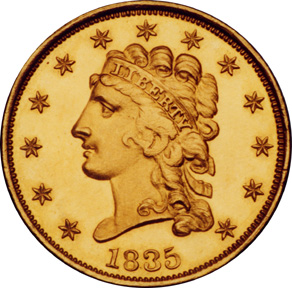
The obverse of a "Classic Head" quarter eagle

The Classic Head was a coin design issued by the United States Mint in the early 19th century. It was introduced for copper coinage in 1808 by engraver John Reich and later redesigned by Chief Engraver William Kneass.

== Dates minted ==
- (John Reich) Half cents: 1809 to 1836
- (John Reich) Large cents: 1808 until 1814
- (William Kneass) Quarter eagle: 1834 to 1839
- (William Kneass) Half eagle: 1834 to 1837

== Description ==
The short-lived Classic Head (or as some collectors called it, "Turban Head") interpretation of Liberty was designed by John Reich for use on the half cent and the large cent; however, the design used on the silver and gold coins was developed by William Kneass. The Classic Head depicted Liberty with long, curly hair. The reverse designed by John Reich depicted the coin's denomination and value inside a wreath.

Kneass's design, however, scaled down the design so it would fit on smaller coins and then added a heraldic eagle on the reverse, substituting the simple design by John Reich. A similar design on gold coinage kept the name "Classic Head", but only retained the curly hair. The head was completely redesigned by William Kneass, and featured a traditional maiden with a ribbon binding her long, curly hair.

This variety omitted "E pluribus unum" from the reverse of the coin. In 1840, a smaller head was designed to conform with the appearance of the larger gold coins, therefore making the Classic Head design obsolete. The new Classic Head design was produced from 1834 to 1839.

The Classic Head variety was usually preceded by the Draped Bust design and followed by the Matron Head liberty on copper coinage.

== Usage ==
The design was used for the following coins:

- Half cent
- Large cent
- Quarter eagle
- Half eagle

== See also ==
- Classic Head quarter eagle

== Sources ==
- R.S. Yeoman, A Guide Book of United States Coins 2009 Edition.
