= Philippine half-centavo coin =

Half centavo
- Philippines
- Value: 0.005 Philippine peso
- Mass: 2.5 g (0.080 troy oz)
- Diameter: 17.5 mm
- Edge: Plain
- Composition: Bronze
- Years of minting: 1904–1908

Obverse
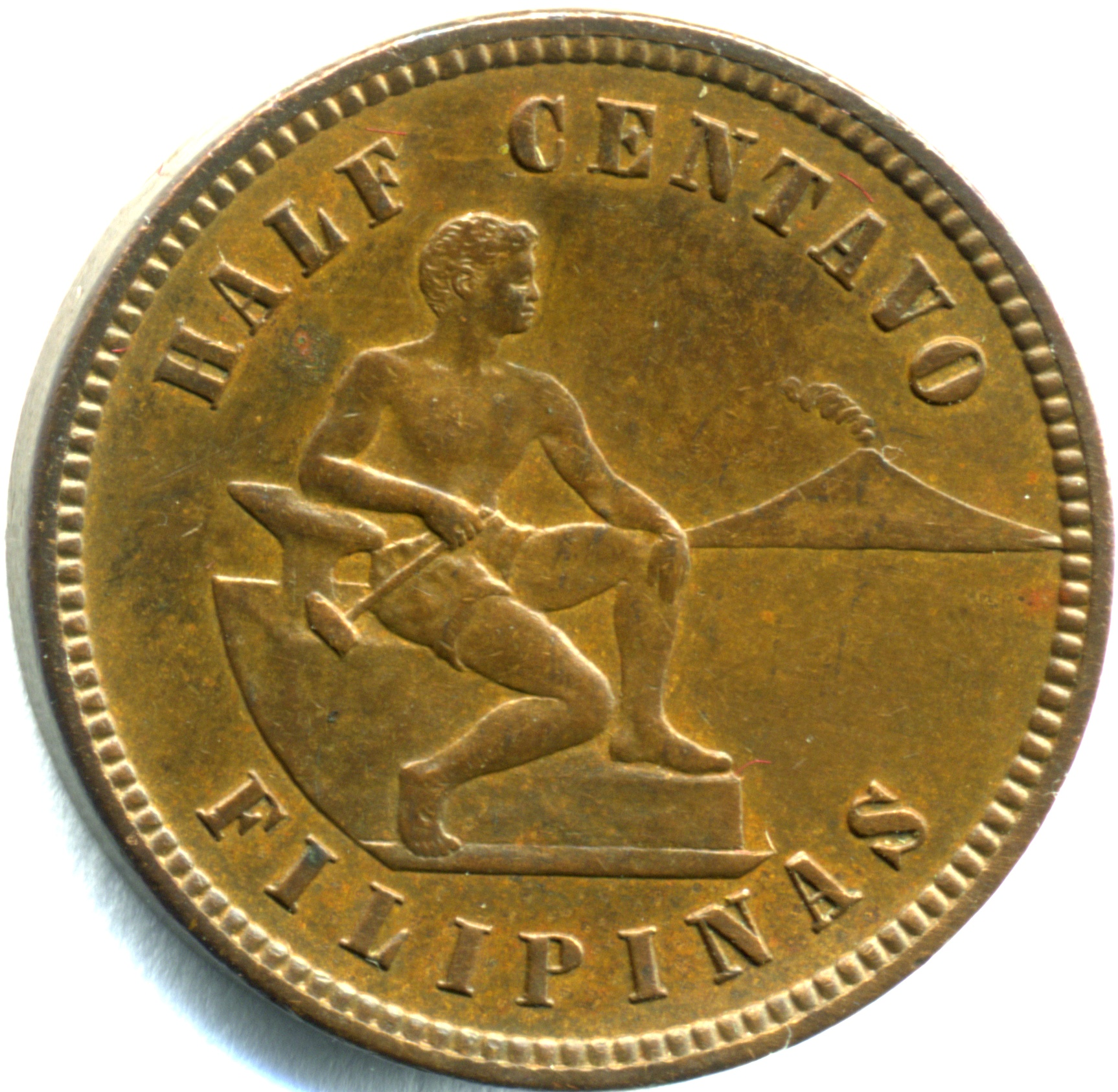
- Design: Figure of a man seated beside an anvil holding a hammer and Mt. Mayon, year of minting
- Design date: 1904

Reverse
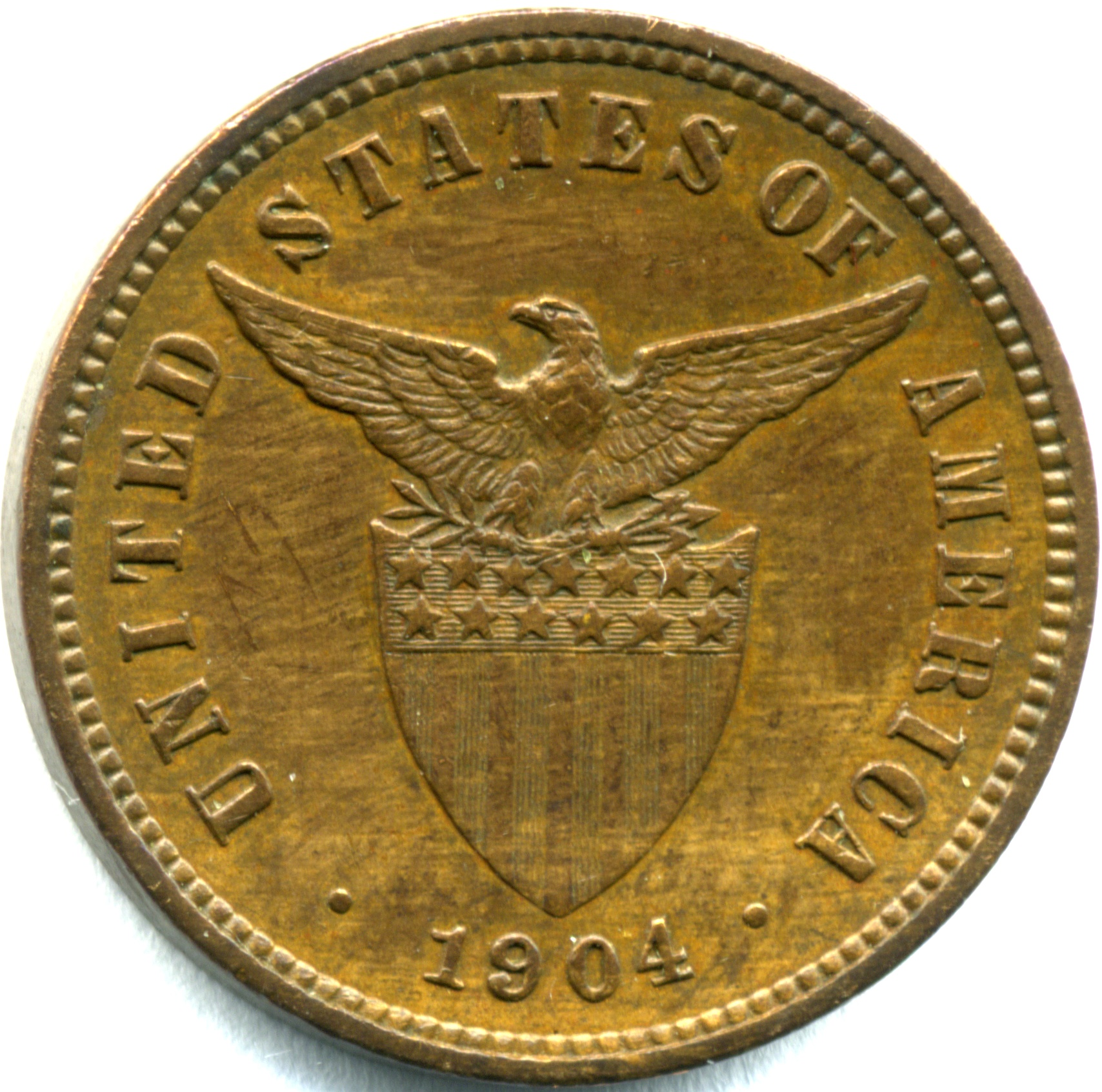
- Design: Seal of the United States of America
- Design date: 1904

The Philippine half-centavo coin (½¢), a denomination of Philippine currency, was issued when the Philippines was under US administration. It bears the names of both countries: Filipinas (the Spanish name of the Philippines) and the United States of America.

Filipino sculptor Melecio Figueroa was hired to design the coin. It features a man with a hammer and anvil, seating in front of Mayon Volcano.

In 1903 and 1904, the US mint at Philadelphia struck bronze-minted half-centavo coins for circulation. Eventually, the coin was withdrawn from circulation because it was rejected by Filipinos for its low value. After 1908, all remaining half centavos were melted.
