= Silver center cent =

American bimetallic pattern coin

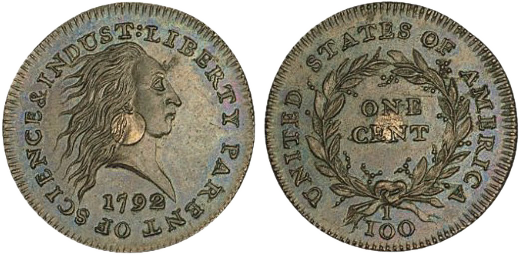
The silver center cent was an early attempt to reduce the size of the cent while maintaining its intrinsic value.

The Silver center cent is an American pattern coin produced by the United States Mint in 1792. As a precursor to the large cent it was one of the first coins of the United States and an early example of a bimetallic coin. Only 12 original examples are known to exist, of which one is located in the National Numismatic Collection at the Smithsonian Institution. Two more specimens (Morris and California) exist but contain fabricated plugs added after minting.

Due to their rarity and historical significance Silver center cents are highly prized by collectors with one graded PCGS MS61 being sold in an online auction in April 2012 for $1.15 million.

== Origins ==
During the early years of the American republic, there was a general consensus that the intrinsic bullion value of the new nation's coinage should be approximately equal to its face value. Some merchants would refuse to accept coins that did not meet this standard. For most denominations, bullion parity was achieved by producing the coins in a gold or silver alloy. However, the Coinage Act of 1792 specified that the cent was to consist of 11 pennyweight (264 grains or 17.1 g) of pure copper. Such a weight, needed to maintain intrinsic value, would have been too heavy for practical everyday use.

U.S. Secretary of State Thomas Jefferson suggested an alternative: a coin made of an alloy that was primarily copper, but that included enough silver to give a reasonably-sized coin an intrinsic value of one cent. This billon alloy was considered by the U.S. Mint, but U.S. Treasury Secretary Alexander Hamilton feared that it would be too susceptible to counterfeiting, since its appearance differed little from that of pure copper. In 1792, the Mint's chief coiner, Henry Voigt, hit upon a solution: a copper planchet, slightly smaller than that of a modern quarter, with a small silver "plug" inserted in a center hole during the striking process. The silver plug would have been worth approximately 3/4¢ at contemporary bullion prices, while the copper planchet added an additional 1/4¢ of intrinsic value. Several such coins were produced as test pieces. Ultimately, the additional labor required for these bimetallic coins proved unsuitable for mass production, and the large cent that was produced for circulation starting in 1793 consisted of 208 grains of 100% copper.

== Design ==
The obverse of the silver center cent features a right-hand facing Liberty head with flowing unbound hair. The date appears below the portrait, and the words "LIBERTY PARENT OF SCIENCE & INDUST." are inscribed in a circular pattern around the central devices. The reverse design consists of a wreath with the words "ONE CENT" in the center, and the fraction "1/100" below. Surrounding the wreath, "UNITED STATES OF AMERICA" is inscribed.

== Specimens ==
List of Known Specimens
Name	Grading	Sales History	Notes
Garrett Specimen	MS67 Brown PCGS	1981 - $95,000; 2012 - $5 million	
Norweb Specimen	MS64 PCGS	1988 - $143,000; 2002 - $414,000; 2011 - $2.5 million; 2011 - $2.8 million; 2014 - $1,997,500	
Bushnell Specimen	MS61+ Brown NGC	2000 - $178,250; 2013 - $822,500	
Morris Specimen	MS61 Brown PCGS	2012 - $1,150,000	Non-genuine center plug
Weinberg Specimen	Mint State	2019 - $750,000	
Smithsonian Specimen	AU		
Stearns Specimen	XF	2015 - $499,375	
Judd Specimen	XF	2018 - $336,000	
Newman Specimen	XF	2014 - $1,410,000	
Queller Specimen	VF30 NGC	1875 - $45; 2009 - $253,000	
Terranova Specimen	VF		
Starr Specimen	Fine 15 PCGS	1992 - $35,200; 2006 - $253,000	
California Specimen	VG10 Details, Scratched ANACS	2006 - $400	Non-genuine center plug determined to be made of iron upon grading
Unplugged Specimen	SP63 PCGS		Missing silver insert
