= 1792 half disme =

American silver coin

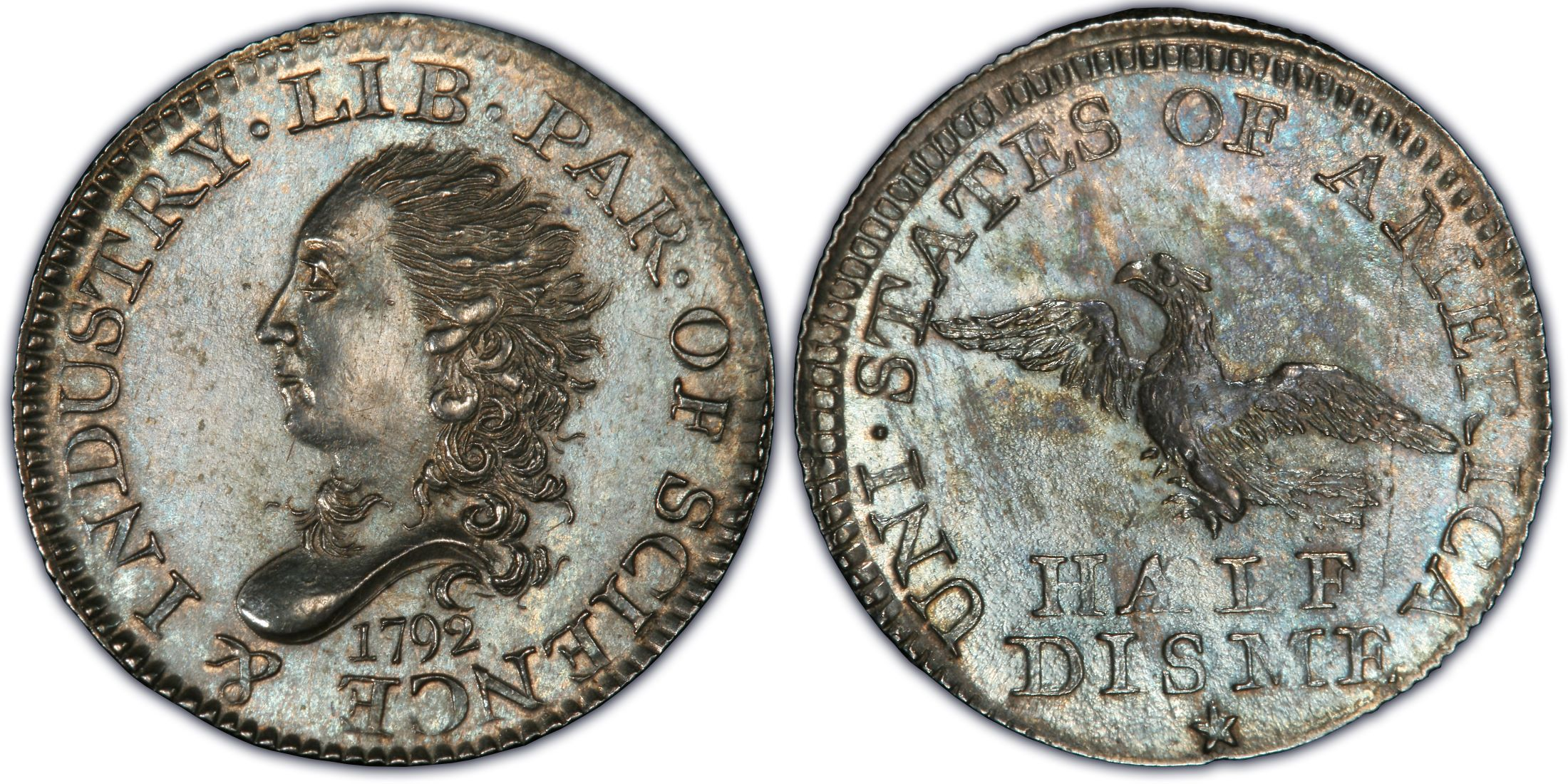
Obverse and reverse of the half disme

The 1792 half disme (/ˈdaɪm/ DYM or /ˈdiːm/ DEEM) is an American silver coin with a face value of five cents (1/20 U.S. dollar) which was minted in 1792. Although it is subject to debate as to whether this was intended to be circulating coinage or instead an experimental issue, President George Washington referred to it as "a small beginning" and many of the coins eventually were released into circulation. It is widely (although not universally) considered the first United States coinage struck under authority of the Coinage Act of 1792.

== Description ==
The coin is 16.5 mm (0.65 in) in diameter. The obverse depicts the head of Liberty and the inscription LIB. PAR. OF SCIENCE & INDUSTRY, "Liberty, parent of Science and Industry." The reverse shows UNI. STATES OF AMERICA and HALF DISME along with an eagle and a star.

== Origins ==
When speaking to the House of Representatives in November 1792, President Washington mentioned the "want of small coins in circulation" and stated that he had begun work on establishing a U.S. Mint and that some half dismes had been produced already. At this point, most of the personnel had been hired, but the Mint's buildings and machinery were not yet ready. As a result, the half dismes, which had been struck in or around July 1792, were produced using the private facilities of local craftsman John Harper, although under the auspices of official Mint personnel. In his personal log book, Secretary of State Thomas Jefferson recorded the receipt of 1,500 specimens on July 13.

Because of President Washington's connection with these early coins, numismatic folklore holds that the portrait on the obverse is that of First Lady Martha Washington and that some of the coins were struck using melted-down silverware from the Washington household. However, there is no solid evidence for either of these assertions. To the contrary, evidence uncovered from Thomas Jefferson's memorandum book shows that he provided "75 (Mexican) Silver Dollars" and received the first 1,500 half dismes. He then spent those coins on his trip home to Monticello.

== Production, rarity, and value ==
Although the exact number is not known, it is believed that between 2,000 and 3,500 specimens were produced. Approximately 10% of these survive today; one expert estimated between 250 and 400 half dismes exist, and most appear to have been used in circulation for some time. A 1792 half disme graded AU55 by PCGS was auctioned for $138,000 on July 23, 2004. A 1792 half disme graded MS65 was valued in 2018 on the American reality television series Pawn Stars at $500,000–600,000. A specimen strike from the Starr collection, graded MS67 by PCGS, sold for $1,322,500 on April 26, 2006. The highest numerically graded piece, an NGC MS68, sold for $1,500,000 by private treaty transaction in 2007. Recently, a PCGS MS68 graded coin was sold by Heritage Auctions on October 8, 2026 for the amount of $2,928,000.

Although nearly all 1792 half dismes were produced in a silver alloy, a unique pattern piece in copper is also known.

== See also ==
- Half dime
- Nickel (United States coin)
- Dime (United States coin)
