= Draped Bust =

Former design used on United States coinage

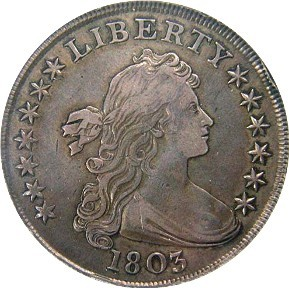
Draped Bust dollar obverse

"Draped Bust" was the name given to a design of United States coins. It appeared on much of the regular-issue copper and silver United States coinage, 1796–1807. It was designed by engraver Robert Scot.

== Basic design ==
In 1796, Congress responded to the almost universal dissatisfaction of the first coins (Flowing Hair dollar) and decreed a new design. As was the custom of the time, all denominations bore the same design or, in this case, the same obverse. By Congressional decree, certain features were required: the eagle, the word Liberty, stars, and United States of America. It was not considered necessary to include the value of the coin since it could be discerned from its size based on the precious metal content. Thus, the half dime was the smallest silver coin (containing 1/20 of the amount of silver in a dollar) and each denomination was larger up to the silver dollar.

=== Obverse ===
All coins (copper and silver) bore the same obverse. Robert Scot, Chief Engraver of the U.S. Mint, 1793–1823, transformed a portrait of a society lady by Gilbert Stuart into a rather buxom Ms. Liberty. Some accounts identify the woman as Philadelphia socialite Ann Willing Bingham. She remained essentially unchanged for several years with the exception of an extra curl added to her flowing locks in 1798.

=== Reverse ===
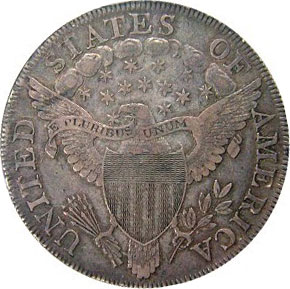
1803 Draped Bust dollar reverse

There are three basic reverse designs. The first, for copper coins, features the value of the coin (half cent or one cent) surrounded by a wreath or vine. The words "UNITED STATES OF AMERICA" encircle the wreath. In 1795-1797, a scrawny, naturalistic bald eagle was depicted on the reverse side of all silver coins. This design is known as Draped Bust, Small Eagle and usually commands a high price due to the extremely low mintage at the time. In 1798, the small eagle was replaced by the Heraldic eagle. This design is known as Draped Bust, Heraldic Eagle. The famous 1804 silver dollar has this design as well the reverse of the Kennedy half dollar in 1964. Three denominations also bore the appropriate fraction: half cent (1/200), large cent (1/100) and half dollar (1/2).

=== Rim ===
The half dollar rim (edge) bore the words FIFTY CENTS OR HALF A DOLLAR.

== Modifications ==
=== Stars ===
Initially, the decision was made to add a star to the obverse of a coin for each new state that joined the union. By 1796, the nation had grown to 15 states with the additions of Vermont and Kentucky. Each denomination was minted with 15 stars. That year Tennessee was admitted and a 16th star was added. Director of the Mint Elias Boudinot realized that the situation could not continue indefinitely and decreed that all coins would contain the original 13 stars. The half dime of 1797 exemplifies the confusion at the time; it was minted with 13, 15 and 16 stars.

=== National motto ===
The Heraldic Eagle introduced a national motto – E pluribus unum (Out of many, one). It appears on a flowing ribbon and is held in the talon of the eagle. In 1956, the national motto was replaced and is now In God We Trust, a phrase that first appeared on American coins in 1864 at the height of the American Civil War.

=== Variations ===
Due to primitive working conditions, materials and poorly constructed dies numerous errors and variations appeared. These include letters and numbers shaped differently, cracks appearing on the surface of the coins, misstrikes and overstrikes (Liberty half dime, 1796), the size of stars or numbers varied from one die to the next (1807 half dollar) and dates overpunched previous dates (1800 large cent, printed over 1798 and 1799). Incongruities persisted: In 1796 the half dollar appeared with 15 stars, then 16 stars. Mysteriously it portrayed 15 stars in 1797 despite the presence of 16 states. Many of these faults are quite rare and demand a high premium due to their scarcity.

== Famous coins ==
The Greatest 100 U.S. Coins selected the 1804 silver dollar as the number one coin. It bears a heraldic eagle on the reverse and the price is prohibitive. Eight were minted in 1834 (Class I) and the rest minted about 1858 (Class II) The 1802 half dime ranks number 61. Only 3,000 were minted and the vast majority of these were either lost, melted or wore out. Most 1802 half dimes that do exist are in extremely poor condition. The 1797 half dollar (ranked 68) has the "small eagle" design. This design is rare due to the very low mintage and the inferior equipment and procedures. Fewer than 3,000 were minted. Its companion, the even rarer 1796 half dollar (ranked 72) had a mintage of only 934. The pair constitute the sole mintage of the half dollar "small eagle" design. One is required for a complete type set, thus there are always more buyers than sellers. The 1796 quarter (seen above) ranked 71. It is also the "small eagle" design and is the only representative in this denomination of that design. Since it too is required for a complete type set, its price continues to rise. Only 6,000 quarters were minted that year. By comparison, the Tennessee State Quarter, one of five struck in 2002, had a mintage of 650,000,000 (the mintage of all state quarters in 2002 was over 3 billion).

== Coins used on ==
- Half cent
- Large cent
- Half dime
- Dime
- Quarter
- Half dollar
- Dollar coin
- Thomas Jefferson's Liberty (First Spouse program), obverse bust only, new reverse design.
