= Robert Scot =

Chief Engraver of the US Mint (1745–1823)

1st Chief Engraver of the U.S. Mint
- In office November 23, 1793 – November 3, 1823
- President: George Washington; John Adams; Thomas Jefferson; James Madison; James Monroe
- Preceded by: office established
- Succeeded by: William Kneass

Personal details
- Born: October 2, 1745 The Canongate, Edinburgh, Scotland
- Died: November 3, 1823 (aged 78) Philadelphia, Pennsylvania, United States
- Spouse: Eunice Beal Scot
- Children: Lucretia, Harriot, Sophia, Robert, Jr., Charlotte
- Occupation: Engraver

Robert Scot (October 2, 1745 – November 3, 1823) was a Scottish-American engraver who served as Chief Engraver of the United States Mint from 1793 until his death in 1823. He was succeeded by William Kneass. Scot designed the popular and rare Flowing Hair dollar coinage along with the Liberty Cap half cent. Scot is perhaps best known for his design, the Draped Bust, which was used on many silver and copper coins. Robert Scot was the most prolific engraver of early American patriotic iconography, with symbols and images depicting rebellion, unity, victory, and liberty throughout his career in America.

== Early life ==
Robert Scott was born on October 2, 1745, in Canongate, Scotland, and was baptized on October 8, 1745. He learned watchmaking, and also was trained as a line engraver by Richard Cooper, Sr. at the Trustees Academy, with classes at the University of Edinburgh.

== Virginia ==
Robert Scott changed his name to Scot (with only one 't'), when he moved to Fredericksburg, Virginia, in 1775. He began engraving plates for Virginia currency in 1775, first using the Arms of Britain. After the landmark Fifth Virginia Convention of May 1776, Scot engraved Virginia currency with the radical Virginia Seal design, which depicted the overthrow of tyranny. In 1778 Scot engraved Virginia currency with the motto Sic Semper Tyrannis meaning "Thus Always to Tyrants." Scot moved from Fredericksburg to the new Virginia Capitol of Richmond in 1780, as Engraver to the Commonwealth of Virginia. Under the direction of Virginia Governor Thomas Jefferson in 1780, Robert Scot engraved the Virginia Happy While United medals as gifts to Native American Indian chiefs. The medals utilized Benjamin Franklin's motto "Rebellion to Tyrants is Obedience to God," along with Scot's 1778 revised Virginia Seal design. On January 4, 1781, Richmond was burned and destroyed by British troops under the command of General Benedict Arnold, who betrayed the patriot cause and went over to the British Army in 1780. After the burning of Richmond, Scot planned his move to Philadelphia in the spring of 1781.

== Philadelphia ==
Scot announced his arrival in Philadelphia with newspaper advertisements in May 1781, listing his engraving shop at the corner of Vine and Front Streets. He began engraving for Robert Morris, then Superintendent of the Office of Finance of the United States, in July 1781. The paper money that Scot engraved for Morris helped to finance the Siege of Yorktown, the decisive battle of the American Revolution. Shortly after that battle, Major Sebastian Bauman commissioned Robert Scot to engrave a map that illustrated the American victory, titled "Investment of York and Gloucester," a magnificent work with elaborate artistry and a factual description of the battle. Scot would continue to engrave for American officers, for the Society of the Cincinnati, and for an accurate 1784 map of United States for Captain William McMurray, based on the 1783 Treaty of Paris. As a Freemason, Robert Scot engraved the frontispiece for Ahiman Rezon, dedicated to General George Washington, for the Grand Lodge of Philadelphia. Scot also reproduced Charles Willson Peale's 1772 portrait of Washington as an authorized drawing and line engraving, while visiting at Mount Vernon.

While in Philadelphia, Robert Scot and his family were members of the Religious Society of Free Quakers, a radical sect of ardent patriots who were disowned by the pacifist Philadelphia Quakers for their constant support of the American Revolution. Other members included Timothy Matlack, the probable scribe of the Declaration of Independence, and seamstress Elizabeth Claypoole, better known as Betsy Ross.

== The Great Seal of the United States ==
The Declaration of Independence of the United States initiated a requirement for a national seal that would represent the sovereignty of the United States of America. After three design committees had not yet completed the design work for the Great Seal, Secretary of Congress Charles Thomson was given the assignment to complete the design in June 1782. Thomson's design utilized many of the features of the committees' work, and was approved by Congress on June 20, 1782. The engraver for the original Great Seal die was attributed as Robert Scot by Richardson Dougall and Richard Patterson in their book, The Eagle and the Shield. The primary source of their attribution was a note by Thomson for payment of a seal to Robert Scot. The only seal that Thomson is known to have been involved with is the Great Seal. Other evidence includes exact stylistic and technical attributes of Robert Scot's engravings to the Great Seal die, including a star constellation for the Commissioner of Revenue seal, the eagle for 1782 frontispiece engraving of Ahiman Rezon, and borders on a 1783 seal for the College of William and Mary.

== Book illustrations ==
Robert Scot engraved 25 copperplates of scientific illustrations for Thomas Dobson's 1788 American reprint of William Nicholson's Natural Philosophy. These engravings were the largest number of scientific illustrations for a book printed in America at that time, and were considered to be "superior in elegance to those executed in London." Thomas Dobson then proceeded with a fourteen year endeavor to publish an American Edition of the Encyclopædia Britannica beginning in 1790, protected under the American Copyright Act of 1790. Robert Scot engraved the largest number of engravings for Dobson's Encyclopædia, and subsequently hired four apprentice engravers, Samuel Allardice, Francis Shallus, Benjamin Jones, and John Draper. The engraving of quality scientific illustrations by Robert Scot and his apprentices helped to rapidly expand the publication of illustrated books within the United States during the 1790s.

== Chief Engraver of the United States Mint ==
Robert Scot was commissioned Chief Engraver of the United States Mint on November 23, 1793, after the tragic death of non-commissioned engraver Joseph Wright from the yellow fever epidemic of 1793. To continue his obligations for Dobson's Encyclopædia, Samuel Allardice was made partner with Scot, and the engraving firm of Scot & Allardice would utilize apprentices to finish a large number of book illustrations until their partnership ended in 1796.

The Coinage Act of 1792 mandated design requirements for United States coins, including an obverse "emblematic of liberty" and a reverse with "the figure or representation of an eagle." Scot's initial coinage designs included the Liberty Cap half cent and the Flowing Hair silver coins. In 1795, Scot engraved designs for the first gold coins of the U.S. Mint that included a drapery for Miss Liberty. The drapery was continued with silver coins starting in 1795, with the famous Draped Bust design. After several reverse issues for silver and gold coins with small eagle designs, Scot introduced the Heraldic Eagle reverse in 1796, a modification of the Great Seal of the United States. Upon request, Robert Scot penned a four page letter to Congress in 1795 outlining his responsibilities as Chief Engraver. Robert Scot received a salary of $1200 for each year that he was employed by the United States Mint. During the years 1807–1817, Assistant Engraver John Reich was employed by the United States Mint, and engraved the coin designs of those years. Robert Scot did all of the coinage die engraving at the United States Mint from Reich's resignation until his death in 1823.

== Federal stamps and seals ==
In 1798, Robert Scot engraved rate stamp dies for each state, for use on documentary paper in an effort to raise money for support of the undeclared Quasi-War with France. Under President John Adams, the United States Navy was quickly expanded, which required considerable funding. In 1800, Scot engraved the second series of stamps, known as the Second Federal Issue, to support the Quasi-War, and also the First Barbary War. Scot also engraved the seal for the U.S. Navy Department in 1798, and seal dies for the U.S. Department of State in 1802 and 1817. The current Federal seals for the Navy and State Departments, along with the Great Seal of the United States, retain much of the designs from earlier dies engraved by Robert Scot.

== Death ==
Scot died in office on November 3, 1823, a month after his 78th birthday. United States Mint Director Robert Patterson wrote a letter to President James Monroe on the day that Scot died, stating "It has now become my painful duty to announce to you the sudden decease of our Ingraver [sic], Robert Scot, which took place this morning. He returned to rest last night, apparently in his ordinary state of health. He was, on opening his door in the morning, discovered to have recently expired." Scot was succeeded by William Kneass on January 29, 1824.

== Bibliography ==
- Arner, Robert D. Dobson's Encyclopædia: The Publisher, Text, and Publication of America's First Britannica, 1789–1803. Philadelphia: University of Pennsylvania Press, 1991.
- Dougall, Richardson and Richard Patterson. The Eagle and the Shield: A History of the Great Seal of the United States. Washington, D.C: Department of State, 1978.
- Newman, Eric P. The Early Paper Money of America. Fifth Edition. Iola, Wisconsin: Krause Publications, 2008.
- Nyberg, William F. Robert Scot: Engraving Liberty. Staunton, Virginia: American History Press, 2015. Includes bibliography of primary and secondary sources, appendix of documented Robert Scot engravings.
- Tompkins, Steve M. Early United States Half Dollars: Volume 1 1794–1807: Peculiar, Missouri: Steve M. Tompkins, 2015.

Government offices
Preceded by (none)	Chief Engraver of the U.S. Mint; 1793–1823	Succeeded by William Kneass
