= Large cent =

Former one-cent coin of the United States

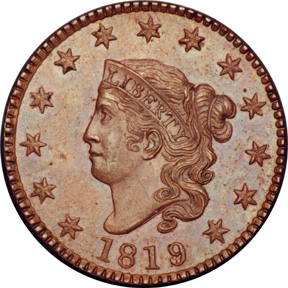
Matron Head large cent, 1819

The United States large cent was a coin with a face value of 1/100 of a United States dollar. Its nominal diameter was 1 1/8 inch (28.57 mm). The first official mintage of the large cent was in 1793, and its production continued until 1857, when it was officially replaced by the modern-size one-cent coin (commonly called the penny).

Large cents were made of nearly pure copper, or copper as pure as it emerged from smelting, without any deliberate addition of other metals (such as occurs in bronze).

== General history ==
First struck in 1793, the large cent was minted every year from 1793 to 1857, except 1815. When the United States declared war in 1812 against Great Britain, coinage was affected. The wartime embargo against shipments made it so the mint could not get any new copper planchets, which were imported from Great Britain, to strike coins. The mint made do with what supply it had and struck coins into 1815. After the war ended in 1815, the mint wasted no time in ordering new planchets. For an unknown reason, no coins were dated 1815 from the supply the mint had in the interim. There may have not been a significant supply of planchets left, and when new ones were received, it may have been easier to use the old design and date. However there is a slight difference in the style of the "4" which may indicate which coins were minted the following year. In addition to the copper shortage, people also hoarded precious metals during the war. Altered and fantasy cents with the 1815 date occasionally appear.

The Philadelphia Mint produced all large cents, which contained twice the copper of the half cent. This made the coins bulky and heavy, bigger than modern-day U.S. quarters.

=== Flowing Hair cents, chain reverse (1793) ===
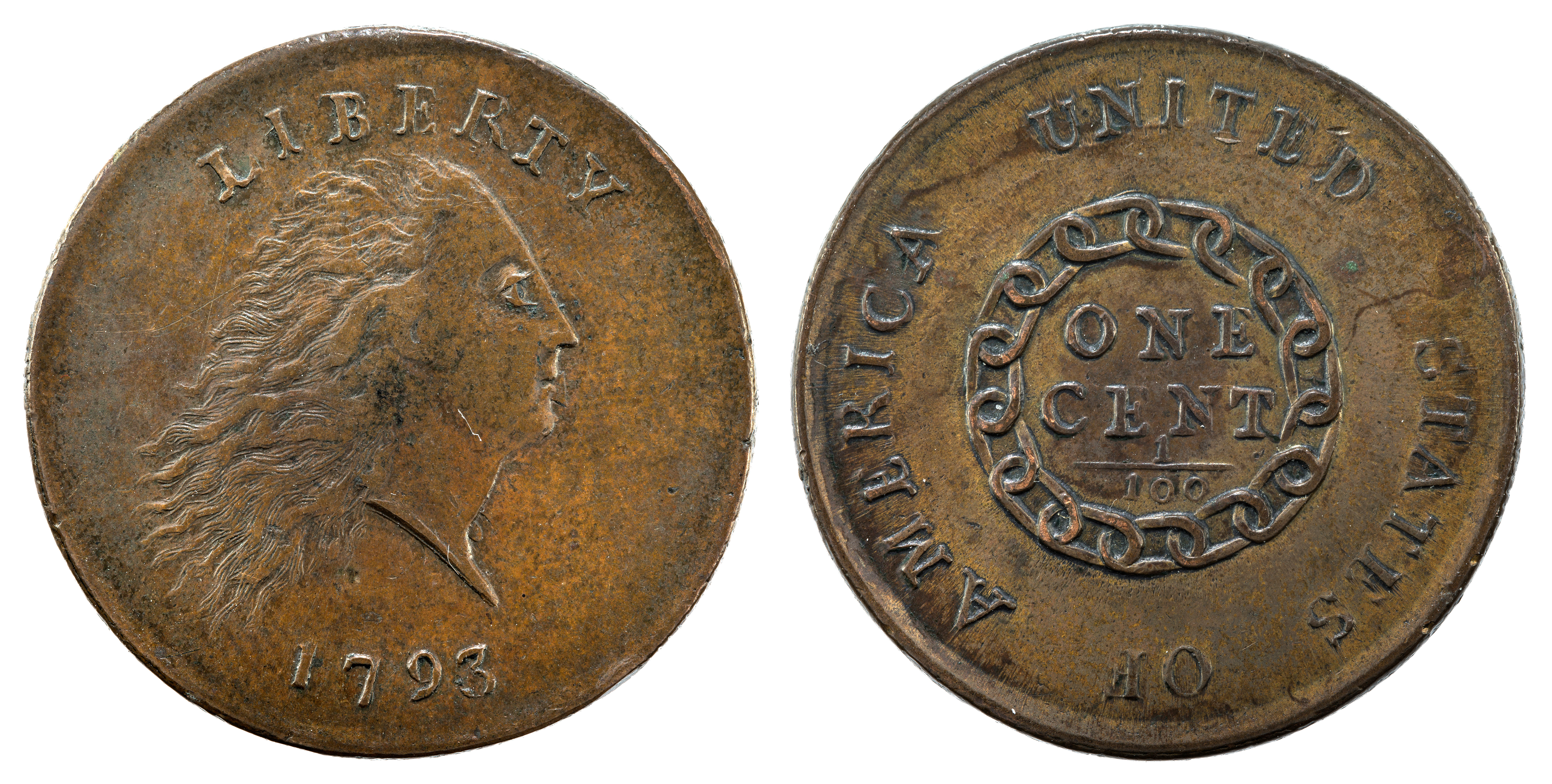
Flowing Hair large cent with Chain reverse, 1793

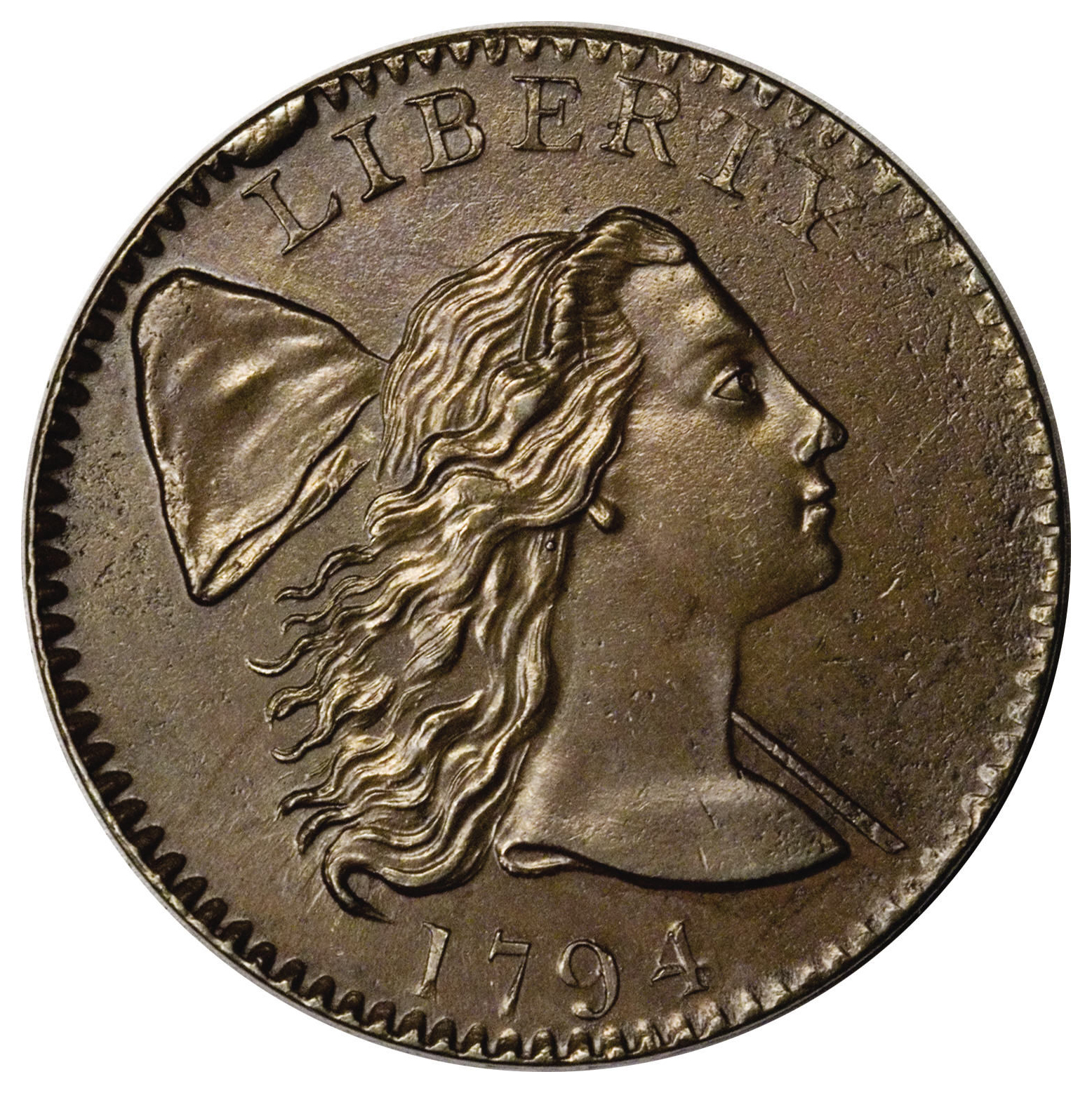
Liberty Cap large cent, 1794

The obverse featured a bust of Liberty with a reverse of a ring of chains. Henry Voigt's design was almost universally criticized in its time for its unattractiveness and perceived allusion to slavery. It bears the distinction, however, of being the first official coinage minted by the United States federal government on its own equipment and premises; 36,103 were minted. Its low survival rate, in addition to its small mintage, coupled with being the first regular federal issue and a one-year design and type, has created an extremely strong demand from generations of numismatists. As a result, all surviving specimens command high prices ranging from $2,000–3,000 in the absolute lowest state of preservation to over $500,000 in the highest.

=== Flowing Hair cents, wreath reverse (1793) ===
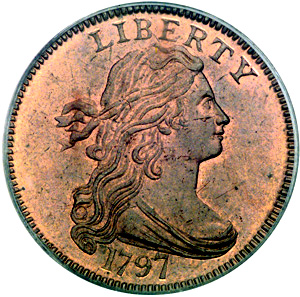
Draped Bust large cent, 1797

The Mint caved in to the intense ridicule later in 1793, and Mint Director David Rittenhouse ordered Adam Eckfeldt to revise the obverse and reverse designs. Liberty's bust was redesigned with even longer, wilder hair, and the chain was removed from the reverse in favor of a wreath. Scholars are undecided as to what plant or plants are depicted in the wreath, with several varieties extant. Total mintage of the wreath reverse numbered about 63,000 pieces.

=== Liberty Cap cents (1793–1796) ===
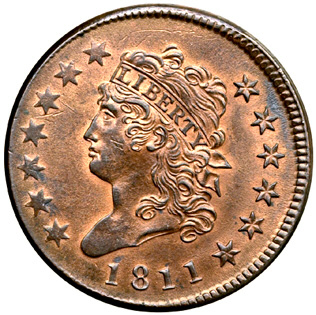
Classic Head large cent, 1811

Rittenhouse was dissatisfied with Eckfeldt's designs, and with the criticism of the Chain cents fresh in his mind, he hired Joseph Wright to re-design the denomination yet again in its troubled first year. Wright's design faced Liberty to the right and "tamed" her wild hair. The Phrygian cap was added as an ancient symbol of freedom. The reverse design was revised to a recognizable laurel wreath, and future Chief Engraver Robert Scot had a hand in several minor revisions to the design over the next three years.

This design was more successful, and it was continued into 1796. In 1795, planchets became too thin for the edge lettering because of a weight reduction, so the mint stopped edge lettering on the cent, and the rest of these coins were made with a plain edge. Four coins from 1795 are known to have a reeded edge.

=== Draped Bust cents (1796–1807) ===
Robert Scot redesigned the whole of United States coinage for 1796, applying a new design featuring a bust of Liberty wearing a drapery at the neckline and a ribbon in her flowing hair. The reverse design now featured an olive wreath. As with earlier types, several minor revisions to the design were made in the first few years, with the final 1797 design lasting through the end of the type in 1807.

Around 1860, an altered 1803 obverse die (re-engraved "1804") and an 1820 reverse die were used to create several unofficial "restrikes" of the rare 1804 cent. While not genuine 1804 cents, they are sometimes collected along with the originals and are listed in various numismatic magazines and A Guide Book of United States Coins.

=== Classic Head cents (1808–1814) ===
John Reich, assistant to Chief Engraver Scot, was appointed by new Mint Director Robert Patterson to redesign Scot's Draped Bust cent (along with every other circulating coin design). The so-called "Classic Head" derives its name from the fillet worn by Liberty on the obverse, though the fillet was worn only by male athletes in ancient Greece. The copper used during the years in which Classic Head cents were minted was of a higher quality, containing less metallic impurity. Consequently, they were softer and more prone to wear and corrode more quickly than issues before or after. As a result, unimpaired, high-grade specimens are especially difficult to obtain and fetch strong premiums when they appear on market, especially with original red or red-brown mint luster.

=== Coronet cents (1815–1857; 1868) ===
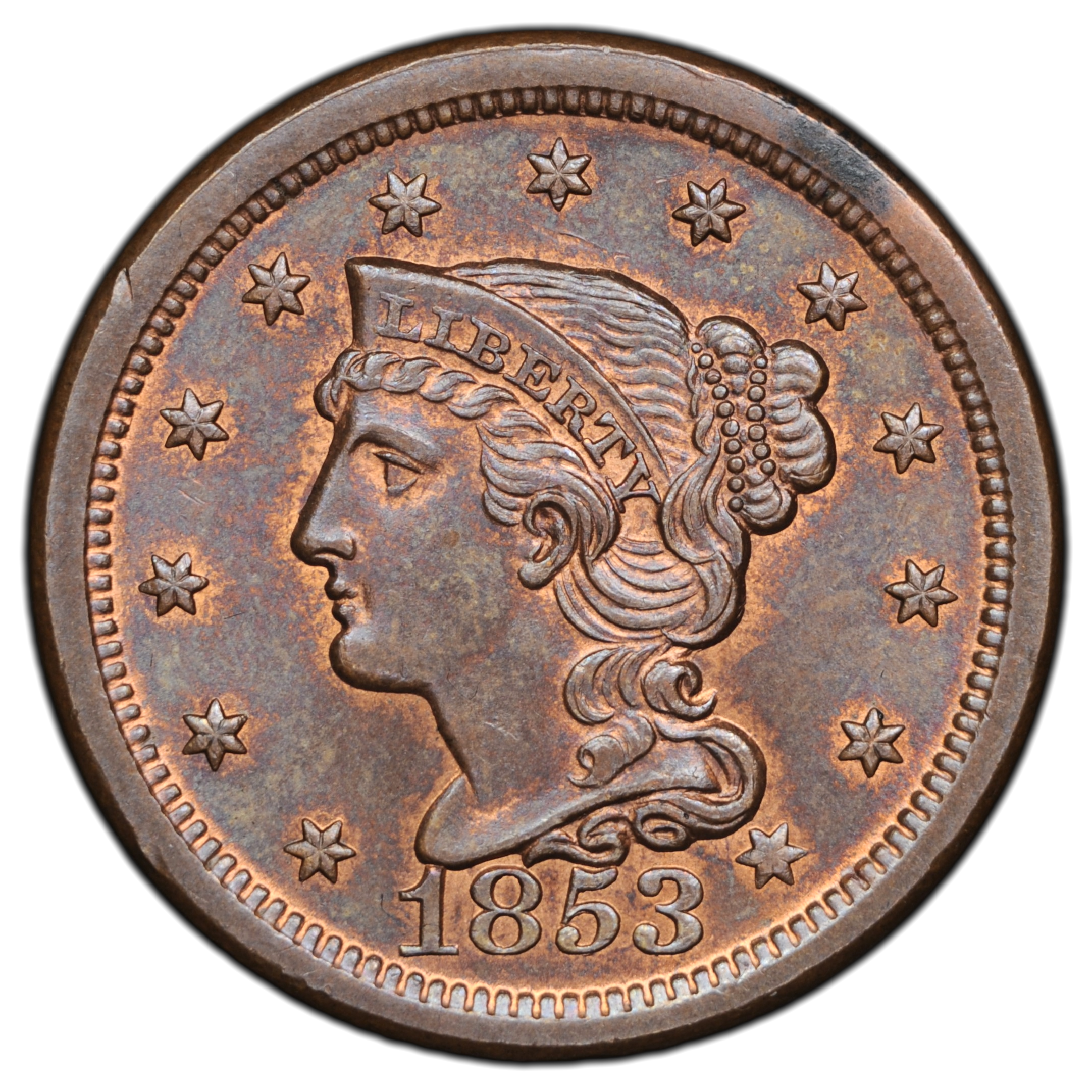
An 1853 Braided Hair cent

==== Matron Head, or Middle Dates (1815–1839) ====
As a response to public criticism of the Classic Head, the Mint assigned Chief Engraver Scot to redesign the cent in April 1815, after the War of 1812. Only 2 Matron Head large cents were produced in 1815 on planchets left over from 1814. This newest design enlarged the obverse portrait, giving Liberty a much more mature look (leading to the Matron Head reference), and surrounded the portrait with stars along the outer edge of the coin. The "Matron head" design was modified in 1835 to give Liberty a younger look, and matron head cents continued to be made until 1839.

Cents dated 1823 were likely minted in 1824 as there is no record of their production. However it appears that a relatively large number were made. Similar to the 1804 restrike cent, around the 1860s-1870s, several "restrikes" of this date were made by a third party not affiliated with the Mint. While not genuine 1823 cents, they are nevertheless sometimes collected alongside their genuine counterparts. The restrike cannot be confused with the original, as it was minted with an 1813 reverse.

==== Braided Hair, or Late Dates (1839–1857; 1868) ====
Facing more negative public reaction, the Coronet cents were redesigned in 1835 by new Chief Engraver Christian Gobrecht. This last major change to the coin updated the obverse by giving Liberty a slimmer, more youthful appearance. Minor tweaks continued through 1843, and the 1843 design prevailed through the end of mintage in 1857.

Some 11 years after the large cent was discontinued, a mint employee coined several large cents dated 1868, almost certainly for sale as instant rarities to numismatists. About a dozen and a half of these unofficial issues, struck in both copper and nickel, are known to survive.

== Mintage figures ==
Flowing Hair

- 1793 – 63,353

Liberty Cap

- 1793 - 11,056
- 1794 - 918,521
- 1795 - 37,000 - lettered edge
- 1795 - 501,500 - plain edge
- 1796 - 109,825

Draped Bust

- 1796 - 363,375
- 1797 - 897,510
- 1798 - 1,841,745
- 1799 - 904,565
- 1800 - 2,822,175
- 1801 - 1,362,837
- 1802 - 3,435,100
- 1803 - 3,131,691
- 1804 - 96,500
- 1805 - 941,116
- 1806 - 348,000
- 1807 - 829,221

Classic Head

- 1808 - 1,007,000
- 1809 - 222,867
- 1810 - 1,458,500
- 1811 - 218,025
- 1812 - 1,075,500
- 1813 - 418,000
- 1814 - 357,830

Liberty Head

- 1816 - 2,820,982
- 1817 - 3,948,400
- 1818 - 3,167,000
- 1819 - 2,671,000
- 1820 - 4,407,500
- 1821 - 389,000
- 1822 - 2,072,339
- 1824 - 1,262,000
- 1825 - 1,461,100
- 1826 - 1,517,425
- 1827 - 2,357,732
- 1828 - 2,260,264
- 1829 - 1,414,500
- 1830 - 1,711,500
- 1831 - 3,359,260
- 1832 - 2,362,000
- 1833 - 2,739,000
- 1834 - 1,855,100
- 1835 - 3,878,400
- 1836 - 2,111,000
- 1837 - 5,558,300
- 1838 - 6,370,200
- 1839 - 3,128,661
- 1840 - 2,462,700
- 1841 - 1,597,367
- 1842 - 2,383,390
- 1843 - 2,425,342
- 1844 - 2,398,752
- 1845 - 3,894,804
- 1846 - 4,120,800
- 1847 - 6,183,669
- 1848 - 6,415,799
- 1849 - 4,178,500
- 1850 - 4,426,844
- 1851 - 9,889,707
- 1852 - 5,063,094
- 1853 - 6,641,131
- 1854 - 4,236,156
- 1855 - 1,574,829
- 1856 - 2,690,463
- 1857 - 333,546

== Collecting ==
With the plethora of varieties, errors, and die states for these early coins, they are a popular collecting endeavor today. In 1966, Herbert A. Silberman placed an ad in Coin World gauging interest in a specialized club devoted to the collecting and researching of large cents and half cents, Early American Coppers. The group holds an annual convention, publishes a quarterly newsletter, Penny-Wise, and conducts meetings and seminars at most major coin conventions.

== See also ==
- Mill (currency)
- United States cent mintage figures
- United States dollar
