= Gobrecht dollar =

US silver dollar coin (1836–1839)

- United States of America
- Value: 1 U.S. dollar
- Mass: 26.73–26.92 g
- Edge: Reeded
- Composition: 89.2% silver, 10.8% copper (some 1836 issues); 90% silver, 10% copper (1836–1839)
- Years of minting: 1836–1839

Obverse
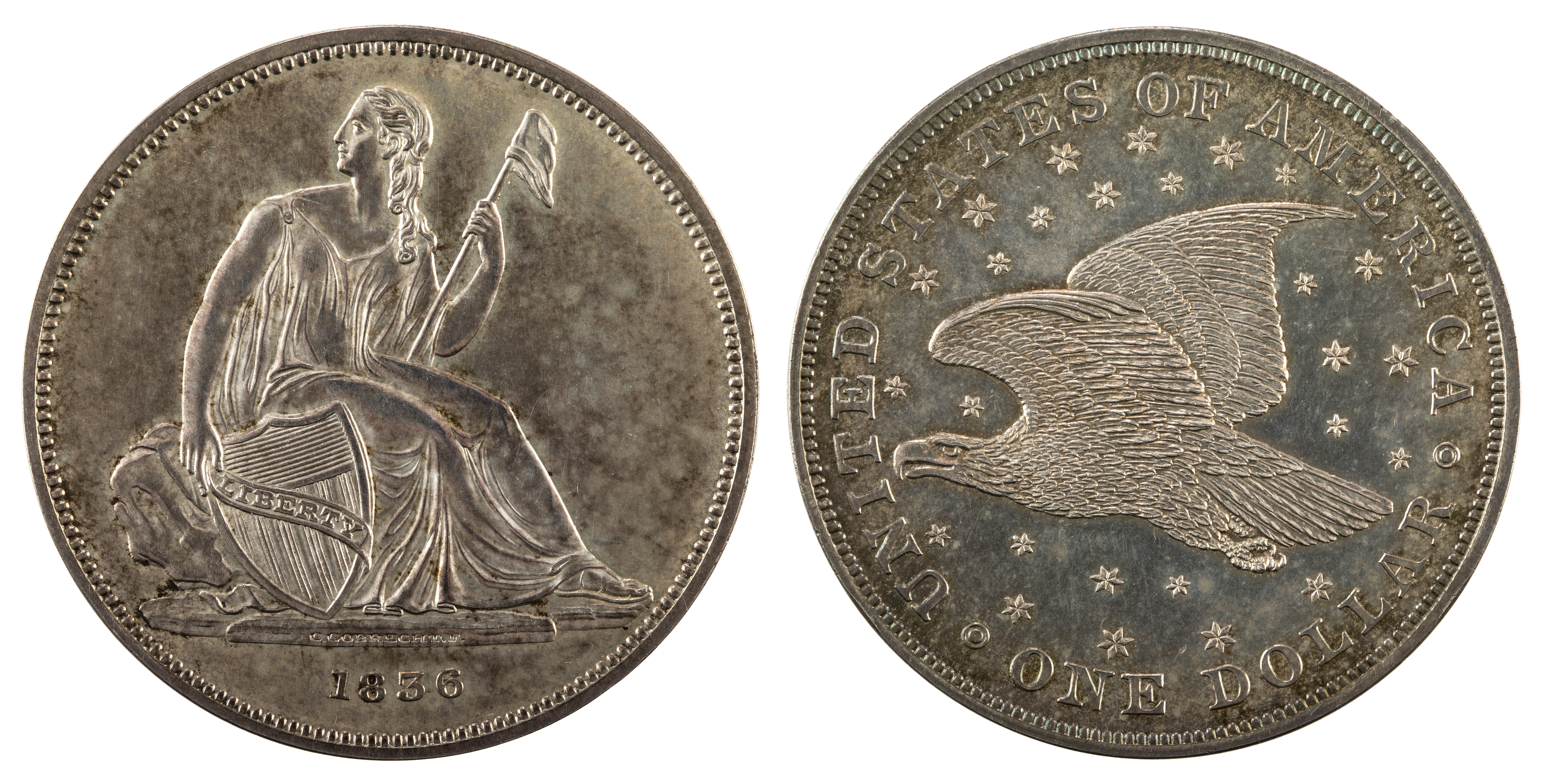
- Design: Seated Liberty
- Designer: Christian Gobrecht (based on a sketch by Thomas Sully)
- Design date: 1836
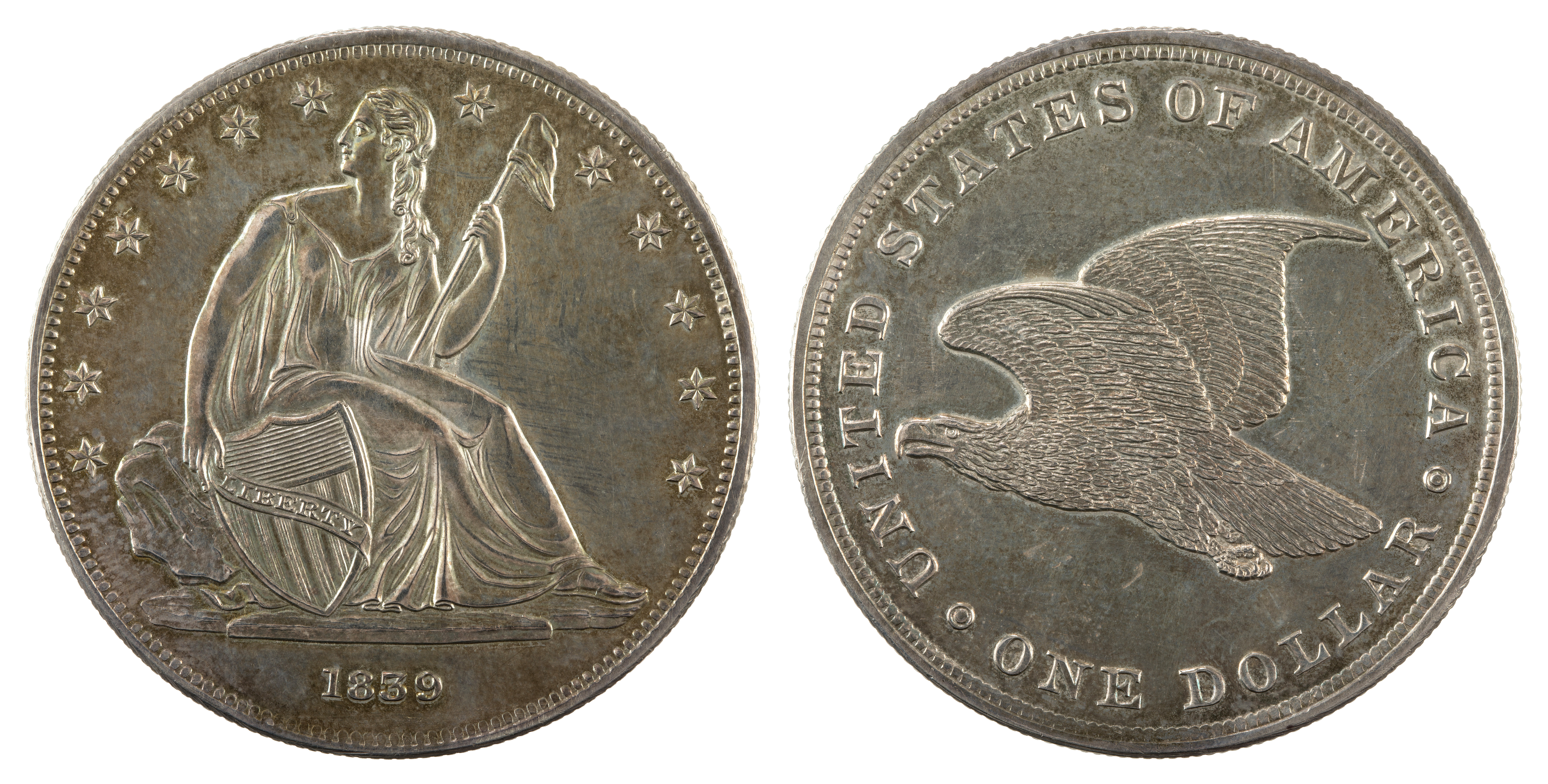
- Design: Seated Liberty
- Designer: Christian Gobrecht
- Design date: 1838

Reverse
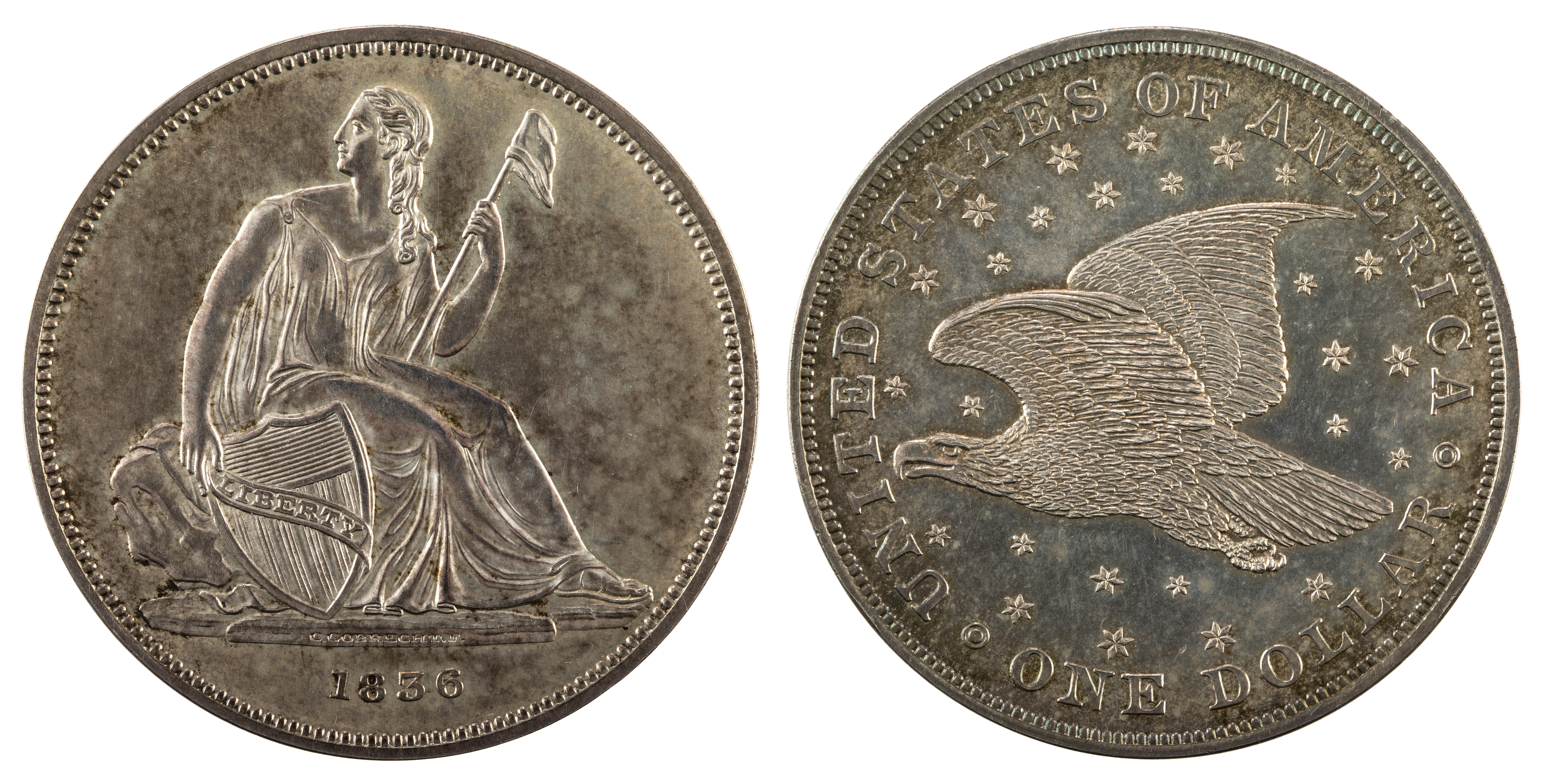
- Design: Soaring bald eagle
- Designer: Christian Gobrecht (based on a sketch by Titian Peale)
- Design date: 1836
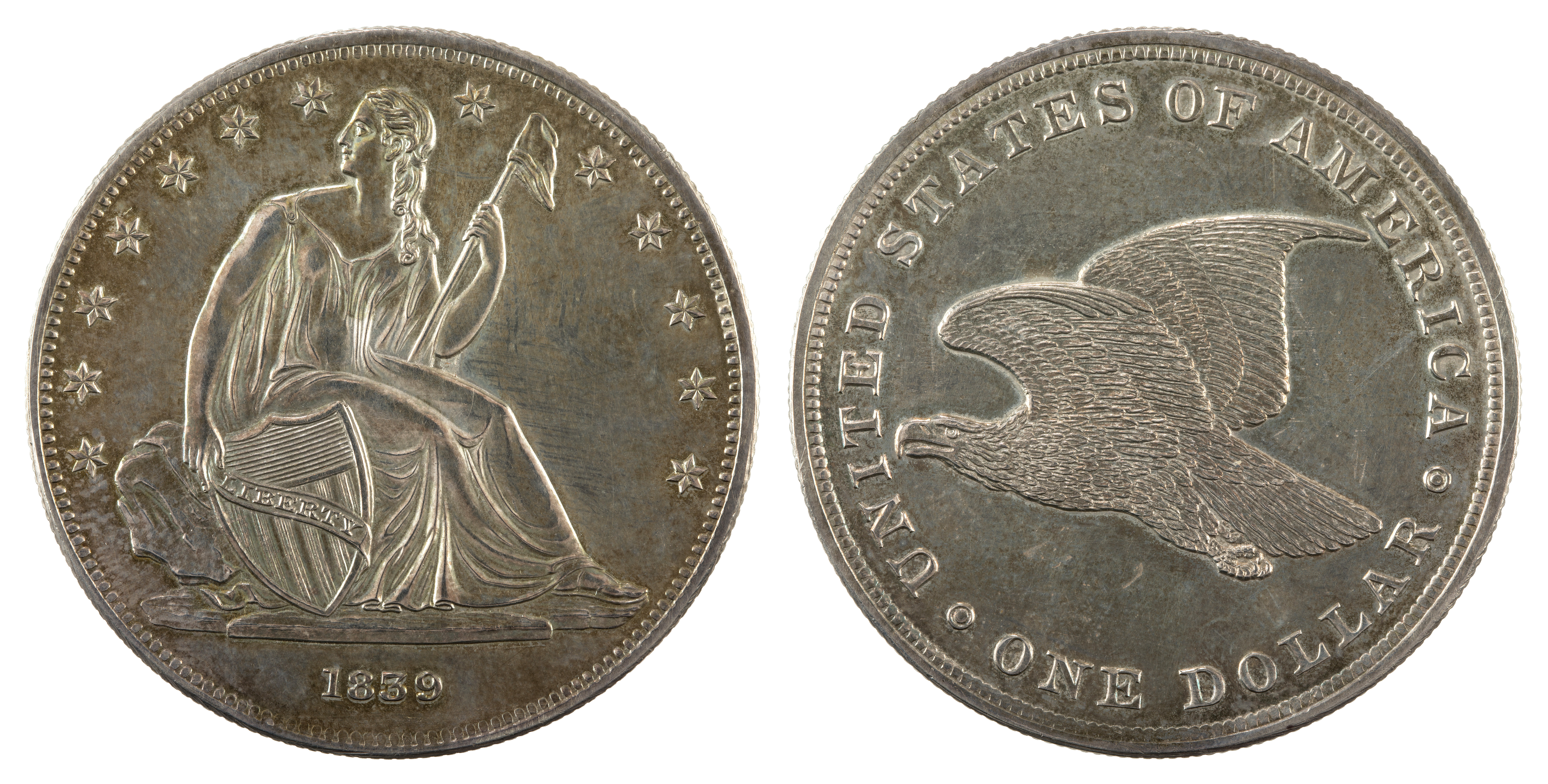
- Design: Soaring bald eagle
- Designer: Christian Gobrecht
- Design date: 1838

The Gobrecht dollar, minted from 1836 to 1839, was the first silver dollar struck for circulation by the United States Mint after production of that denomination had been halted in 1806 (the last previous silver dollars were struck in 1804 but dated 1803). The coin was struck in small numbers to determine whether the reintroduced silver dollar would be well received by the public.

In 1835, Director of the United States Mint Samuel Moore resigned his post, and Robert M. Patterson assumed the position. Shortly after, Patterson began an attempt to redesign the nation's coinage. After Mint Chief Engraver William Kneass suffered a stroke later that year, Christian Gobrecht was hired as an engraver. On August 1, Patterson wrote a letter to Philadelphia artist Thomas Sully laying out his plans for the dollar coin. He also asked Titian Peale to create a design for the coin. Sully created an obverse design depicting a seated representation of Liberty and Peale a reverse depicting a soaring bald eagle, which were adapted into coin designs by Gobrecht. After the designs were created and trials struck, production of the working dies began in September 1836.

After a small quantity was struck for circulation, the Mint received complaints regarding the prominent placement of Gobrecht's name on the dollar, and the design was modified to place his name in a less conspicuous position. In January 1837, the legal standard for the percentage of precious metal in silver coins was changed from 89.2% to 90%, and the Gobrecht dollars struck afterwards reflect this change. In total, 1,900 Gobrecht dollars were struck during the official production run. Production of the Seated Liberty dollar, which utilized the same obverse design as the Gobrecht dollar, began in 1840. In the 1850s, Mint officials controversially re-struck the coins without authorization.

== Background ==
=== 1804 dollar ===
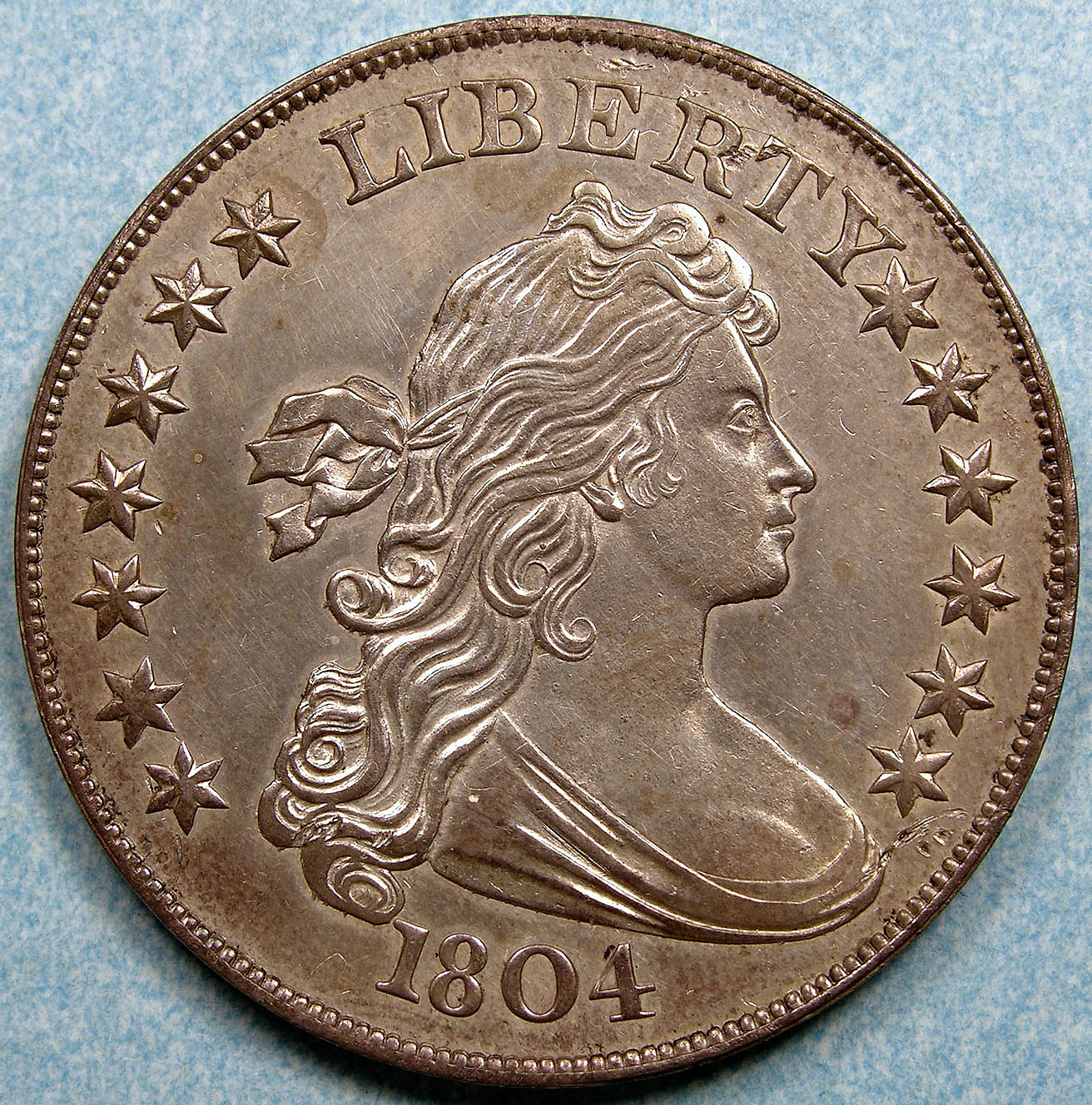
A Class I 1804 dollar

The first silver dollars struck by the United States Mint were minted in 1794. In 1804, the Mint unofficially ended production of silver dollars because many of the coins produced since that denomination had first been struck in 1794 were exported for their silver content to Eastern Asia, especially Canton (modern day Guangzhou). In 1806, then Secretary of State James Madison issued an order officially halting mintage of the coins. In 1831, Mint Director Samuel Moore noticed a reversal; a large shipment of Spanish dollars had recently been shipped from Canton to the United States. Later that year, President Andrew Jackson, at Moore's request, lifted the prohibition.

No further action was taken until the summer of 1834, when officials suggested that proof coin sets be prepared as gifts for Asian dignitaries. After examining Mint records, personnel incorrectly concluded that the last Draped Bust dollars minted were dated 1804, so they chose that date for the coins. It is unknown why the current date was not used, but numismatic historian R.W. Julian suggests the coins were predated to prevent coin collectors from becoming angered when they would be unable to obtain the newly dated coins, which were struck in very small numbers. It is unknown precisely how many 1804 dollars were struck, though eight are known to be extant.

=== Design ===
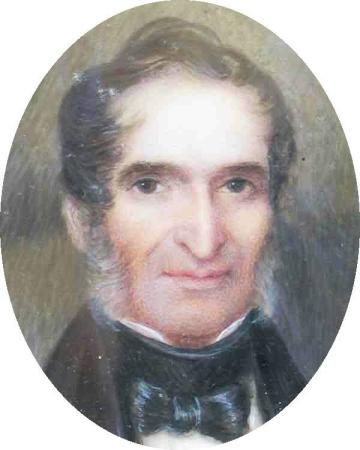
Christian Gobrecht engraved both sides of the dollar named for him.

Later, in 1835, Mint officials began preparations for a series of silver dollars which, unlike the 1804 dollar, were intended to enter circulation in order to determine whether the denomination would be well received by the public. In June 1835, Moore resigned his post as director, and was replaced by Robert M. Patterson. Shortly thereafter, Director Patterson approached two well-known Philadelphia artists, Titian Peale and Thomas Sully, to create a design that would be used to overhaul most of the American coins then in production. Mint Chief Engraver Kneass prepared a sketch based on Patterson's conception, but soon suffered a stroke, leaving him partially incapacitated. Following Kneass' stroke, government officials approved Patterson's urgent request that Philadelphia medallist Christian Gobrecht be hired immediately to fulfill the duties of engraver; Director Moore requested the same prior to his resignation, but no action was taken immediately.

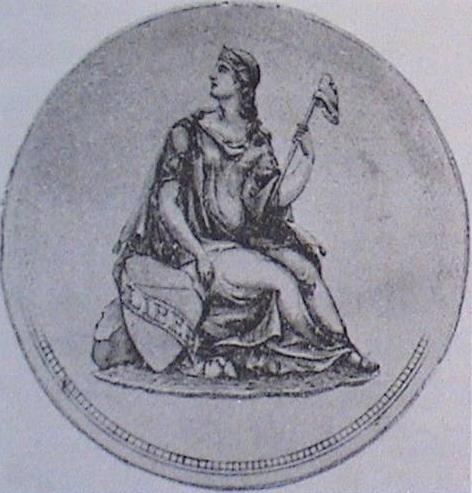
Thomas Sully created a depiction of Liberty seated that would form the basis for the obverse of the Gobrecht dollar.

In a letter dated August 1, 1835, Patterson proposed that Sully create a Seated Liberty figure for the obverse, suggesting that the "figure be in a sitting posture—sitting, for example, on a rock." Patterson also suggested that the seated figure should hold in her right hand a pileus atop a liberty pole to be "emblematic of Liberty". Numismatic historian Don Taxay notes the similarity between Patterson's Seated Liberty concept and designs already in use on British copper coinage: "Liberty thus emerged as a refurbished Britannia, her trident replaced by a staff and pileus." In the same letter, Patterson also informed Sully of his vision for the reverse, which Peale would execute: "I propose an Eagle flying, and rising in flight, amidst a constellation, irregularly dispersed, of 24 stars [representing the number of states then forming the Union], and carrying in its claws a scroll with the words E PLURIBUS UNUM". Patterson preferred a soaring eagle because he believed that the heraldic eagle commonly used on American coins, which he dismissed as a "mere creature of imagination", was unappealing as a design. According to a common story, the flying eagle seen on the Gobrecht dollar was modeled after Peter, the Mint's pet eagle, who was taxidermied after his death by becoming caught in a coining press and remains on display at the Mint to this day.

In September 1835, Thomas Sully received from Patterson a set of British coins and medals to help guide him while creating the Seated Liberty design. Sully sent Patterson three rough sketches near the beginning of October, and those were given to Gobrecht, who in turn set about making a copper engraving of the design. Gobrecht completed the engraving on October 14, and Patterson presented prints created from it to several government officials in an effort to gain their approval. President Jackson, Treasury Secretary Levi Woodbury, and the rest of the cabinet all approved of the design. On October 17, while Jackson and his cabinet were reviewing the design, Woodbury wrote Patterson giving permission to proceed with creating dies for the new coins based on the prints. In January 1836, die trials were conducted in soft metal. These pieces were then circulated among the public for suggestions. Patterson then authorized production of a steel obverse die; the reverse could not yet be created because Peale had yet to complete his design to Patterson's satisfaction. While Peale continued his work, Gobrecht began work on a design for a gold dollar, which occupied much of his time at the Mint. On April 9, Patterson wrote a letter to the Treasury secretary in which he included several of Peale's drawings; Patterson viewed one of the designs as the best created to date. Despite the director's approval of the design, he instructed Peale to continue until Patterson was satisfied. This was evidently achieved, because Patterson had Gobrecht to begin work on a reverse die in June. In August, Patterson sent a uniface striking of the reverse die to President Jackson, who approved designs for both sides of the coin

== Production ==
In September 1836, Chief Coiner Adam Eckfeldt began sinking the working dies that would be used to strike the coins. However, before production could begin, Patterson ordered that Gobrecht's name be added to the dollar. His name appeared as "C. GOBRECHT F", short for "Christian Gobrecht Fecit", meaning "Christian Gobrecht made it". The Gobrecht dollar was first struck in December 1836. Several pieces were produced and distributed throughout Philadelphia. Despite a positive reception for the overall design, many criticized the prominent display of Gobrecht's name on the coin. Gobrecht requested that his name be removed entirely from the face of the coin; instead, the engraver was instructed to change its size and placement at the behest of Patterson.

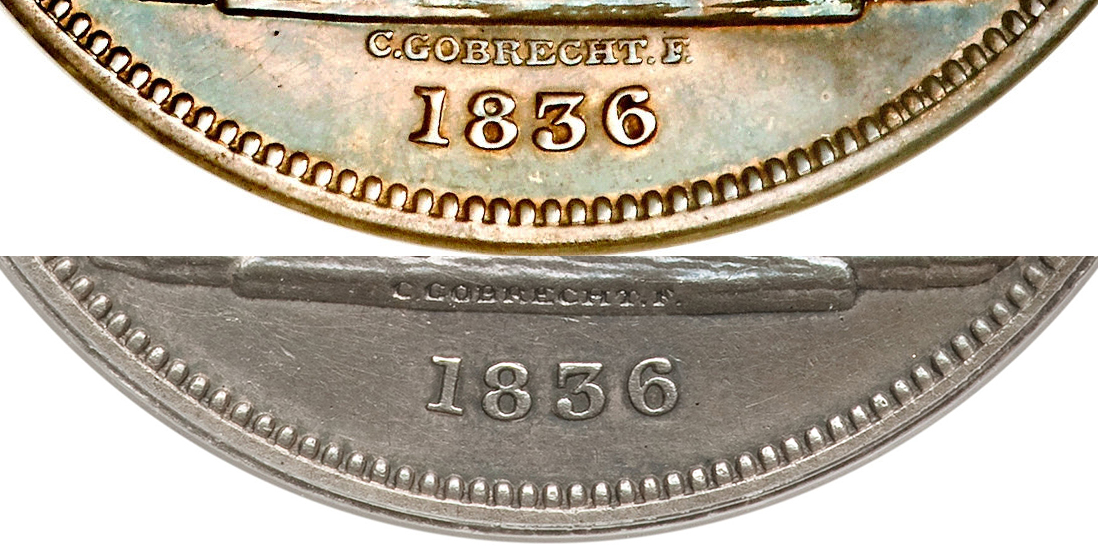
The prominent position of Gobrecht's name (top) was altered (bottom) at the behest of Patterson.

When the full-scale production began, the reverse eagle was surrounded by 26 stars rather than 24 as Patterson had originally requested of Sully, as the states of Arkansas and Michigan had been admitted to the Union since Patterson's letter was penned in 1835. Some of the Gobrecht dollars produced were struck with 'medal alignment', meaning that the obverse and reverse images both face upward when the coin is rotated around its vertical axis. For the 1837 production (which kept the 1836 date), Patterson ordered that the coins be struck in coin alignment, the opposite of medal alignment, and the practice with current US coins (the two faces both are upright when the coin is rotated about its horizontal axis). An act of January 18, 1837, officially changed the legal standard for silver coins from 89.2% to 90% silver. Numismatic historian Walter Breen asserts that those pieces struck before the passage of this act are technically patterns (or coins created to test their design, composition or other points), as they were not authorized by Congress. In total, 1,000 pieces dated 1836 were struck in 89.2% silver and 600 in 90% silver. Gobrecht dollars struck prior to passage of the act weighed 26.96 grams (0.951 oz), while those struck later weighed 26.73 grams (0.943 oz).

Persistent public demand for the new coins prompted Woodbury to contact Patterson, requesting more silver dollars. In 1838, the design was modified to remove the stars from the reverse. Throughout the production run, a number of different Gobrecht dollar patterns, which differed from the general issues, were struck. A small number were struck bearing the date of 1838 that did not bear Gobrecht's initials in any form. In total, 300 dollars of this type dated 1839 were struck for circulation, all in medal alignment. Patterson's trial issue had evidently been a success, as full-scale production of the Seated Liberty dollar began in 1840. The Seated Liberty dollar utilized an obverse design based on that of the Gobrecht dollar, though the reverse was altered from a soaring to a heraldic eagle.

=== Restrikes ===
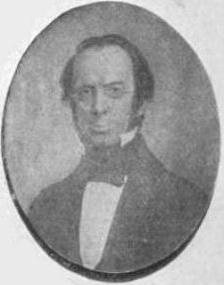
James Ross Snowden created restrikes of rare coins.

Following an increase in coin collecting among the public in the mid-nineteenth century, there arose considerable demand for older American coins. Mint Director James Ross Snowden began selling restrikes of Gobrecht dollars and trading them for rare medals (especially those depicting or relating to former president George Washington), which were then added to the Mint's coin collection, then known as a coin cabinet. The money generated from selling the restrikes went toward purchasing new items for the coin cabinet. The restrikes created under Snowden's tenure were likely struck in 1859 and 1860, but the practice was largely halted after the eruption of a public scandal; other Mint employees were creating and selling restrikes of early American coins for their own profit. All Gobrecht dollar restrikes, when tilted on their axis, depict the reverse eagle flying level, rather than upward as it is depicted on the coins struck during the official production run. It is unknown precisely why the orientation of the eagle was altered, though it is believed by many numismatists that Snowden did this intentionally to make restrikes distinguishable from originals. Numismatic historian Walter Breen suggests that Snowden simply used the alignment because that was the same used on the Flying Eagle cent, which began production in 1856. Mint Engraver James B. Longacre, its designer, had borrowed Gobrecht and Peale's eagle reverse for the one-cent coin's obverse.

== Bibliography ==
- Adams, Edgar Holmes; Woodin, William Hartman (1913). United States Pattern, Trial and Experimental Pieces. New York, NY: American Numismatic Society.
- Breen, Walter (1988). Walter Breen's Complete Encyclopedia of U.S. and Colonial Coins. New York, N.Y.: Doubleday. ISBN 978-0-385-14207-6. OL 4404444M.
- Julian, R.W. (1993). Bowers, Q. David (ed.). Silver Dollars & Trade Dollars of the United States. Wolfeboro, New Hampshire: Bowers and Merena Galleries. ISBN 0-943161-48-7.
- Lange, David W. (2006). History of the United States Mint and its Coinage. Atlanta, Ga.: Whitman Publishing. ISBN 978-0-7948-1972-9.
- Taxay, Don (1983) [1966]. The U.S. Mint and Coinage (reprint ed.). New York, NY: Sanford J. Durst Numismatic Publications. ISBN 978-0-915262-68-7.
- Yeoman, R.S. (2010). A Guide Book of United States Coins (63rd ed.). Atlanta, GA: Whitman Publishing. ISBN 978-0-7948-2767-0.

Online sources

- United States Congress (January 18, 1837). "Act of January 18, 1837" (PDF). United States Mint. Archived from the original (PDF) on September 20, 2012.

Preceded by Draped Bust dollar	Dollar Coin of the United States; 1836–1839	Succeeded by Seated Liberty dollar
