= Carson City Mint =

- U.S. Mint
- U.S. National Register of Historic Places
- Nevada Historical Marker
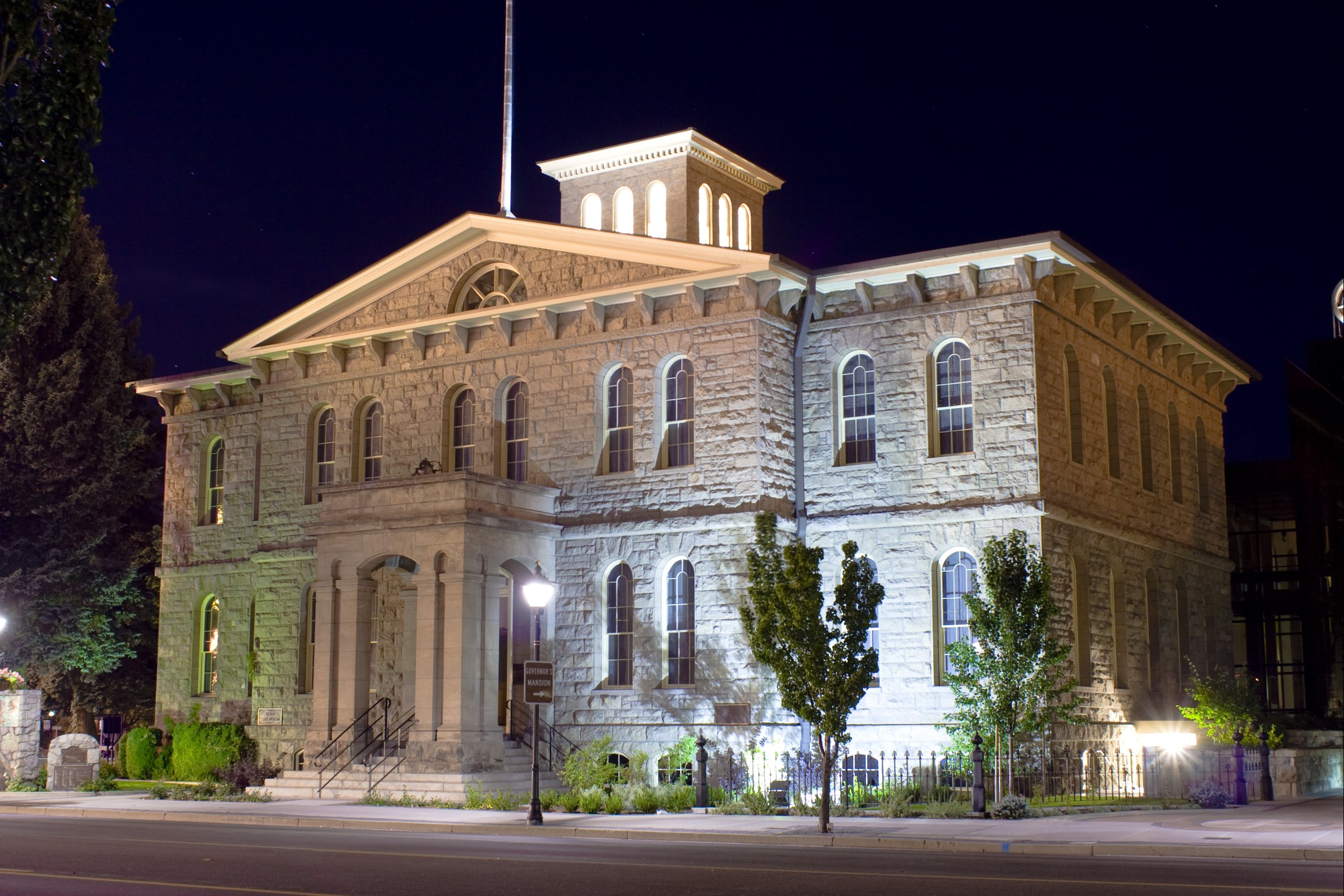
- Carson City Mint at night
- Location: 600 N. Carson St. Carson City, Nevada
- Coordinates: 39°10′03″N 119°46′02″W
- Architect: Alfred Bult Mullett
- NRHP reference No.: 75002127
- No.: 196
- Added to NRHP: September 5, 1975

The Carson City Mint was a branch of the United States Mint in Carson City, Nevada. It primarily minted silver coins; however, it also minted gold coins, with a total face value in dollars nearly equal to that of its silver coins. Built at the peak of the Comstock Lode silver boom conveniently near silver mines, 50 issues of silver coins and 57 issues of gold coins minted here between 1870 and 1893 bore the "CC" mint mark. The facility minted coins in 21 (non-consecutive) years.

The Carson City Mint was created in 1863 but was not put into operation until 1870. It ran until 1885, went on a hiatus, and resumed operations in 1889, after which it ran until 1893, when it closed permanently. Since 1941, the building has housed the Nevada State Museum, Carson City. Coins struck here, especially Morgan dollars, are generally rare and command a high premium among collectors.

== History ==
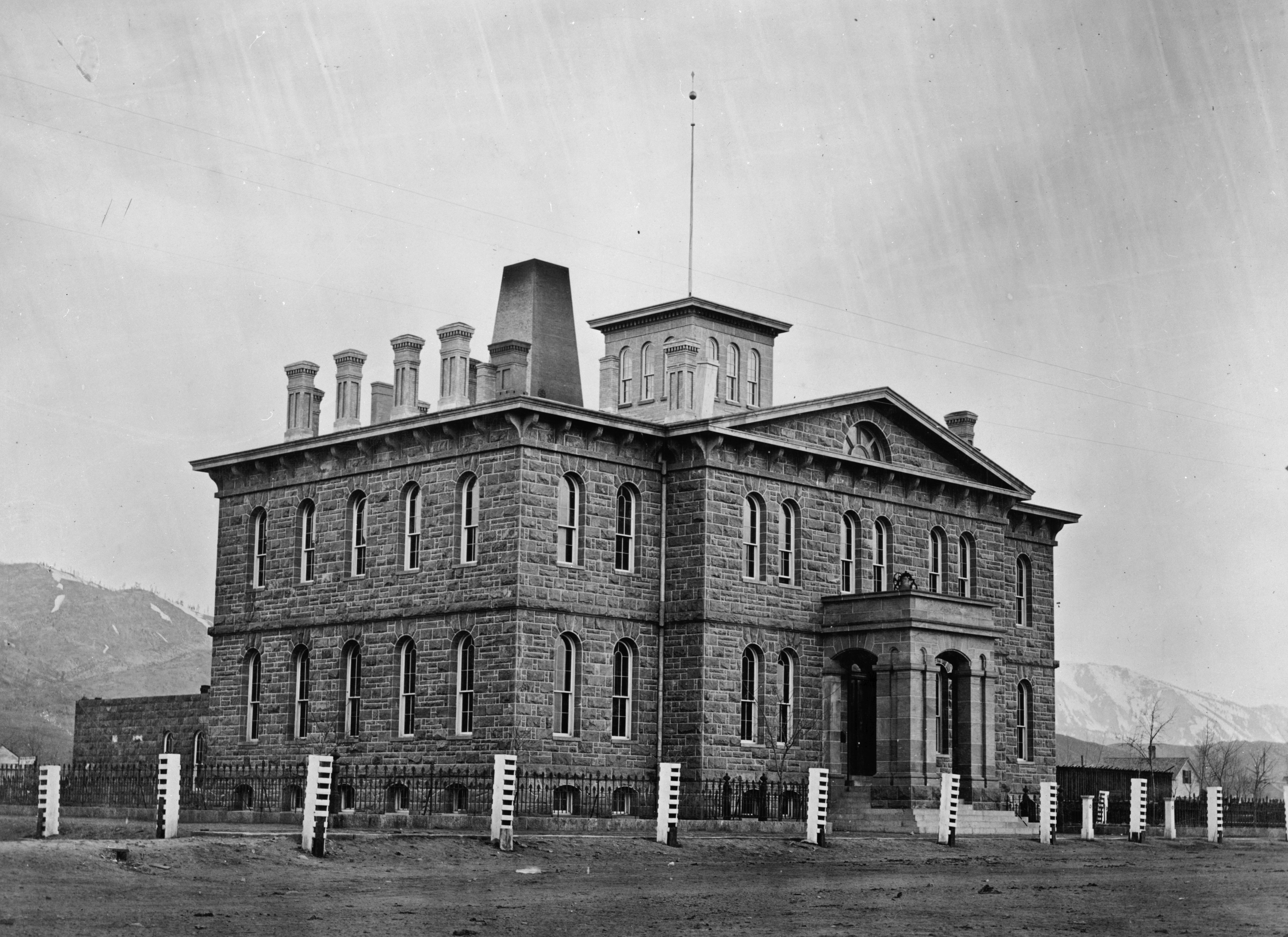
Carson City Mint, 1866

The American Civil War had reduced the federal government's mintage capacity, and new facilities were needed to replace those lost in the south. The mint was established in Carson City to facilitate the manufacture of silver coins from silver in the Comstock Lode, much as the San Francisco Mint was established to facilitate minting gold coins from the gold of the California gold rush. Production commenced on February 4, 1870, with Seated Liberty dollars being the first issue struck at the facility. Low output meant early "CC" coins had limited reach beyond the local area, though large quantities of double eagles were exported abroad as payments after 1873.

Mint operations were suspended on September 11, 1885 amid the anti-silver stance of the Grover Cleveland administration. Mintage costs had risen considerably by then. (Note: Dollars and double eagles at Carson City were coined at a cost of 7.28¢ (equivalent to $2.61 in 2025 adjusted for inflation) per piece, compared to 1.49¢ (equivalent to $0.53 in 2025 adjusted for inflation) at the New Orleans Mint that year.) Further, most Comstock silver and gold had been sent directly to San Francisco, as shippers demanded higher rates for both delivery to Carson City as well as outbound shipping of minted coins. Coinage resumed in September 1889.

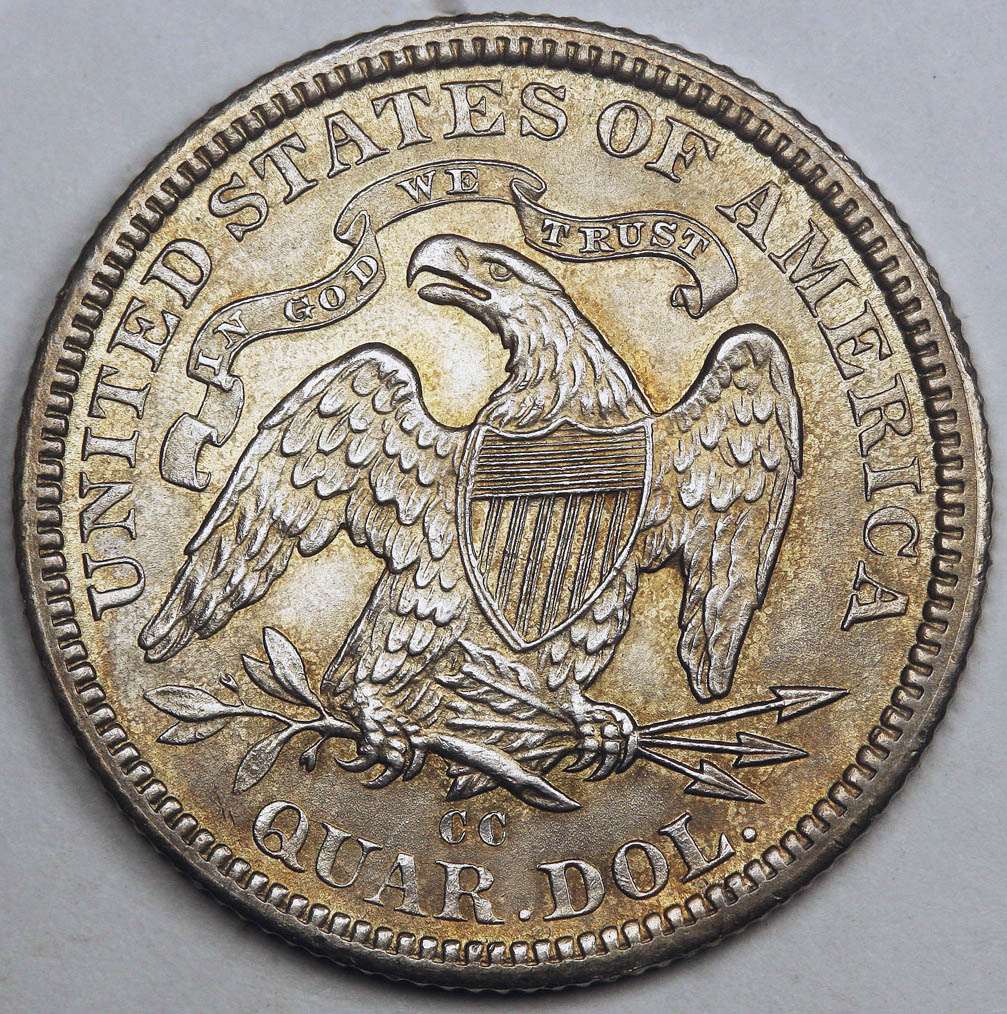
The "CC" mint mark on the reverse (tails) of a Seated Liberty quarter minted at Carson City

At its peak, the mint employed 75 people. Over its operational life, the mint produced over $50 million in gold and silver coinage, the final strikes taking place before June 1893. Minting operations ceased amid a series of scandals allegedly involving mint employees and locals stealing bullion (and some allegations would be proven true in court a few years later). Despite the original intent, most Comstock silver bypassed Carson City and was shipped to San Francisco for processing there. After 1893, the building served as a bullion depository. It was further designated a U.S. Assay Office in 1899. The Mint is mostly known for its coins, however the quantity of silver bullion paid out in ingots far outweighed the amount of coinage it ever produced. The federal government sold the building to the state of Nevada in 1939.

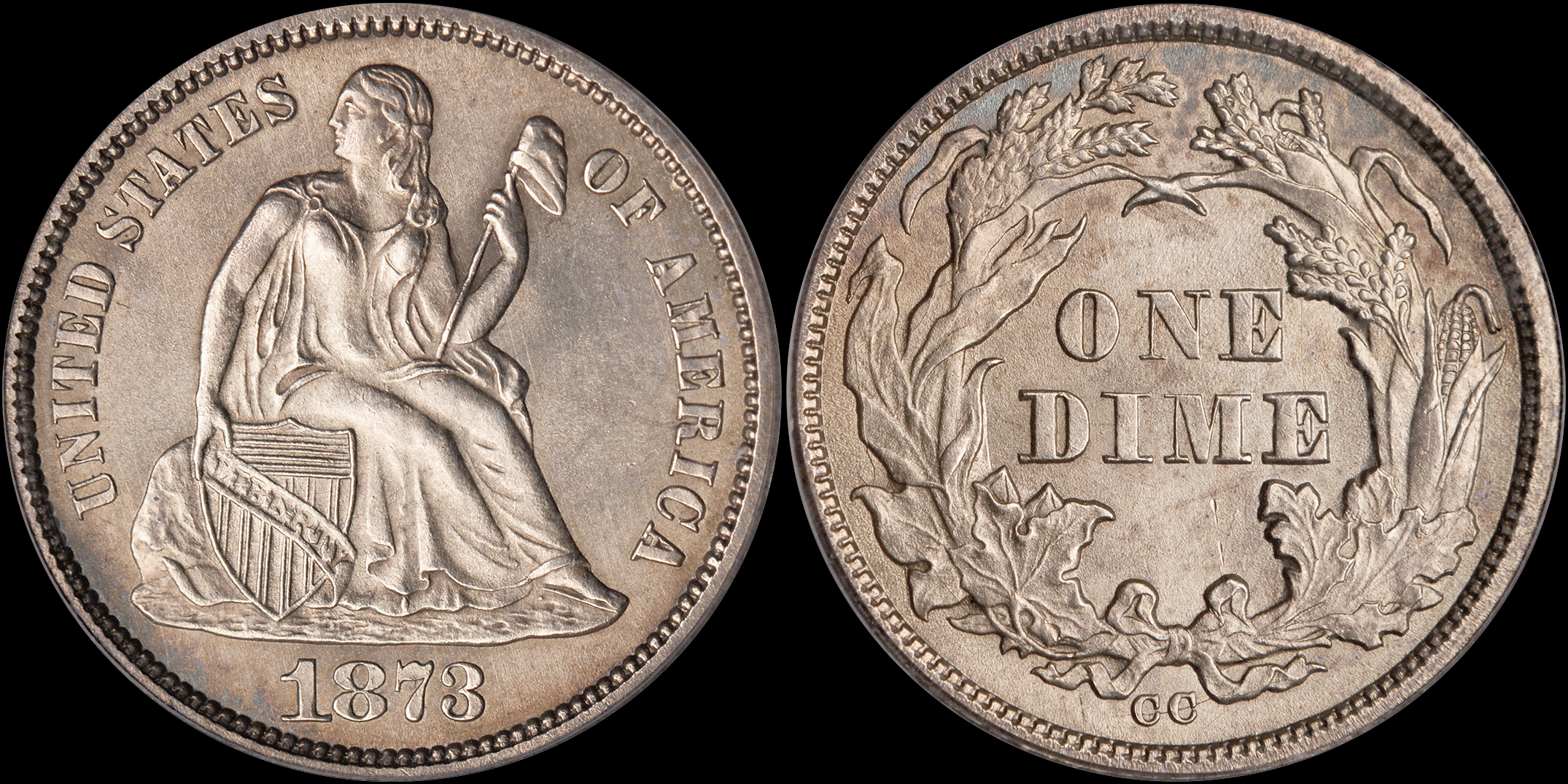
1873-CC Without Arrows Dime PCGS MS-65 — The rarest CC coin with only one known example. It sold in 2012 for $1.84 million. (Note: equivalent to $2.02 million in 2025 adjusted for inflation)

The building has served as home of the Nevada State Museum since 1941. Although the mint has not struck United States coins since 1893, Coin Press No. 1 (the original coin press from the mint) is still in the building and used to strike commemorative medallions with the "CC" mint mark. The Museum contains displays about mint operations as well as the coin collections of Norman H. Biltz. Amid the coin shortages of the mid 1960s, Mint resources were so stretched that an exhibit at the Museum, a c. 1870s flywheel coin press, was shipped to Denver and refurbished to once again produce coins.

=== Proposed commemorative coin production ===
On July 16, 2019, a bill was introduced proposing to strike commemorative Morgan and Peace dollars on the premises of the Nevada State Museum in 2021. If it had passed, the coins would have featured the "CC" mint mark, becoming the first legal tender coins to do so in 128 years. Aside from adding a new date to both the Morgan and Peace dollar series, it would have been the first time the Peace dollar was struck with the mint mark.

The bill received support from many coin collectors, with the American Numismatic Association encouraging collectors to express their support. However, some collectors voiced their concerns about the mintage limit of 500,000 pieces.

Though 2021 Morgan commemorative dollars were struck with a "CC" privy mark, they were not struck at the former Carson City Mint.

== Design and architecture ==
The Nevada State Museum in 1991

The building that housed the mint was the first designed by Alfred B. Mullett after becoming Supervising Architect of the Department of the Treasury. The construction supervisor was Abraham Curry, also known as the "Father of Carson City." Curry served as the first superintendent of the mint until 1870 when fellow commissioner Harry Rice assumed the office. The simple Renaissance Revival-style stone facade has pairs of round-headed windows and a center portico.

== Denominations minted ==
=== Silver denominations ===
Coin type	Series	Years minted	Image	Notes
Dime	Seated Liberty	1871–1878		Arrows appear on dimes minted in 1873 and 1874. A single 1873-CC dime without arrows is known.
Twenty-cent piece	Seated Liberty	1875–1876		Proposed by Nevada Senator John P. Jones, it proved a failure due to confusion with the quarter. Fewer than two dozen 1876-CC examples are known; one sold at auction for $870,000 in 2022. (Note: equivalent to $957,158 in 2025 adjusted for inflation)
Quarter	Seated Liberty	1870–1878		Arrows appear on quarters minted in 1873 and 1874. While 4,000 were minted, there are only six known examples of the 1873-CC quarter without arrows.
Half dollar	Seated Liberty	1870–1878		Arrows appear on half dollars minted in 1873 and 1874.
Dollar	Seated Liberty	1870–1873		Dollars were the first coins struck at Carson City on February 4, 1870.
Dollar	Trade dollar	1873–1878		
Dollar	Morgan dollar	1878–1885; 1889–1893		

=== Gold denominations ===
Coin type	Series	Years minted	Image	Notes
Half eagle ($5)	Liberty Head	1870–1884; 1890–1893		
Eagle ($10)	Liberty Head	1870–1884; 1890–1893		
Double eagle ($20)	Liberty Head	1870–1879; 1882–1885; 1889–1893		Type II minted until 1877; after 1877, Type III.

== See also ==
- Historical United States mints
- The Dalles Mint
- Nevada State Museum, Carson City
- Sherman Silver Purchase Act

== Notes ==
Preceded by Los Angeles and Salt Lake Railroad last spike	Nevada Historical Markers; 196	Succeeded by Arrowhead Trail II
