= Christian Gobrecht =

American US Mint engraver (1785–1844)

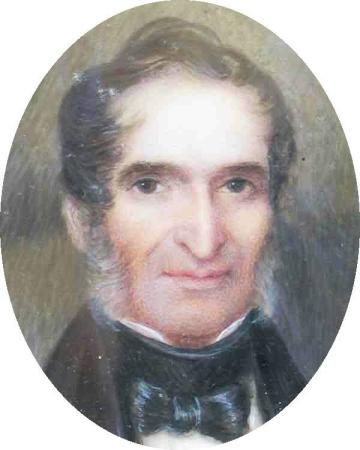

3rd Chief Engraver of the U.S. Mint
- In office December 21, 1840 – July 23, 1844
- President: Martin Van Buren; William Henry Harrison; John Tyler
- Preceded by: William Kneass
- Succeeded by: James Barton Longacre

Personal details
- Born: December 23, 1785 Hanover, Pennsylvania, United States
- Died: July 23, 1844 (aged 58) Philadelphia, Pennsylvania, United States
- Spouse: Mary Hamilton Hewes
- Occupation: Engraver, inventor

Christian Gobrecht (December 23, 1785 – July 23, 1844) was the third Chief Engraver of the United States Mint from 1840 until his death in 1844. He was responsible for designing the famous "Seated Liberty" designs, which were in turn the direct inspiration for the design of the Trade Dollar. He designed the Gobrecht Dollar, which was struck in small quantities from 1836 to 1838 and later inspired the Flying Eagle cent. He also designed the obverse sides for the Liberty head (aka Coronet Head) Quarter Eagle, Half Eagle, and Eagle gold coins, as well as the "braided hair" type Half cent and Large cent coins.

== Early life and career ==
Gobrecht was born on December 23, 1785, in Hanover, Pennsylvania, to Reverend John C. Gobrecht, who came to America from Germany in 1755, and Elizabeth Sands, with ancestry going back to 1642 in Plymouth Colony. After apprenticing in Manheim, Pennsylvania, he engraved ornamental clockworks in Baltimore, Maryland, until he moved to Philadelphia in 1811 to join Murray, Draper, Fairman, and Company, an engraving firm, around 1816. He invented a medal ruling machine in 1810, which he improved upon in 1817. In 1823, Mint Director Robert Patterson sought to engage Gobrecht as assistant director, but Gobrecht declined the position. Instead, in December, Gobrecht sought the position of chief engraver of the Mint, writing to President James Monroe. Instead, the position went to William Kneass.

In addition to his professional activities, Gobrecht was an inventor, inventing improvements to the camera lucida, a talking doll, a kind of melodeon, and the medal-ruling machine, which reproduces relief on a plain surface.

== Chief engraver of the U.S. Mint ==
There is extant documentation showing that Gobrecht worked for the Mint as early as 1823 immediately upon the death of the first chief engraver Robert Scot. This was only a temporary appointment until a new chief engraver William Kneass was hired in January 1824. He also engraved and sold letter and numeral punches to the Mint from this point forward and provided a pattern die to the United States Mint in 1826 (of which no examples exist). He became not an assistant but a "Second" engraver in September 1835 after Kneass suffered a debilitating stroke on August 27 of that year. After Kneass' stroke, most all pattern and die work was done by Gobrecht from then on, including the Gobrecht Dollars, which were minted briefly in small quantities from 1836 to 1839. Shortly after Kneass' death in 1840, Gobrecht was appointed Chief Engraver of the U.S. Mint on December 21, 1840. During his tenure as Chief Engraver of the Mint, Gobrecht produced perhaps what he is mainly known for, the Seated Liberty dollar, based on sketches by Thomas Sully, and Titian Peale. That design remained on U.S. coinage as late as 1891 Gobrecht died in July 1844; his place as chief engraver was taken by James B. Longacre.

Additionally to engraving for the Mint, he also produced embossing plaque for bookbinding.

== Bibliography ==
- Taxay, Don (1983). The U.S. Mint and Coinage (reprint of 1966 ed.). New York, N.Y.: Sanford J. Durst Numismatic Publications. ISBN 0-915262-68-1.

Government offices
Preceded by William Kneass	Chief Engraver of the U.S. Mint; 1840–1844	Succeeded by James B. Longacre
