= Trade dollar (United States coin) =

Silver coin for use in East Asia (1873–1885)

- United States
- Mass: 27.2 g (420 gr)
- Diameter: 38.1 mm (1.5 in)
- Edge: Reeded
- Composition: 90% silver 10% copper
- Years of minting: 1873–1885

Obverse
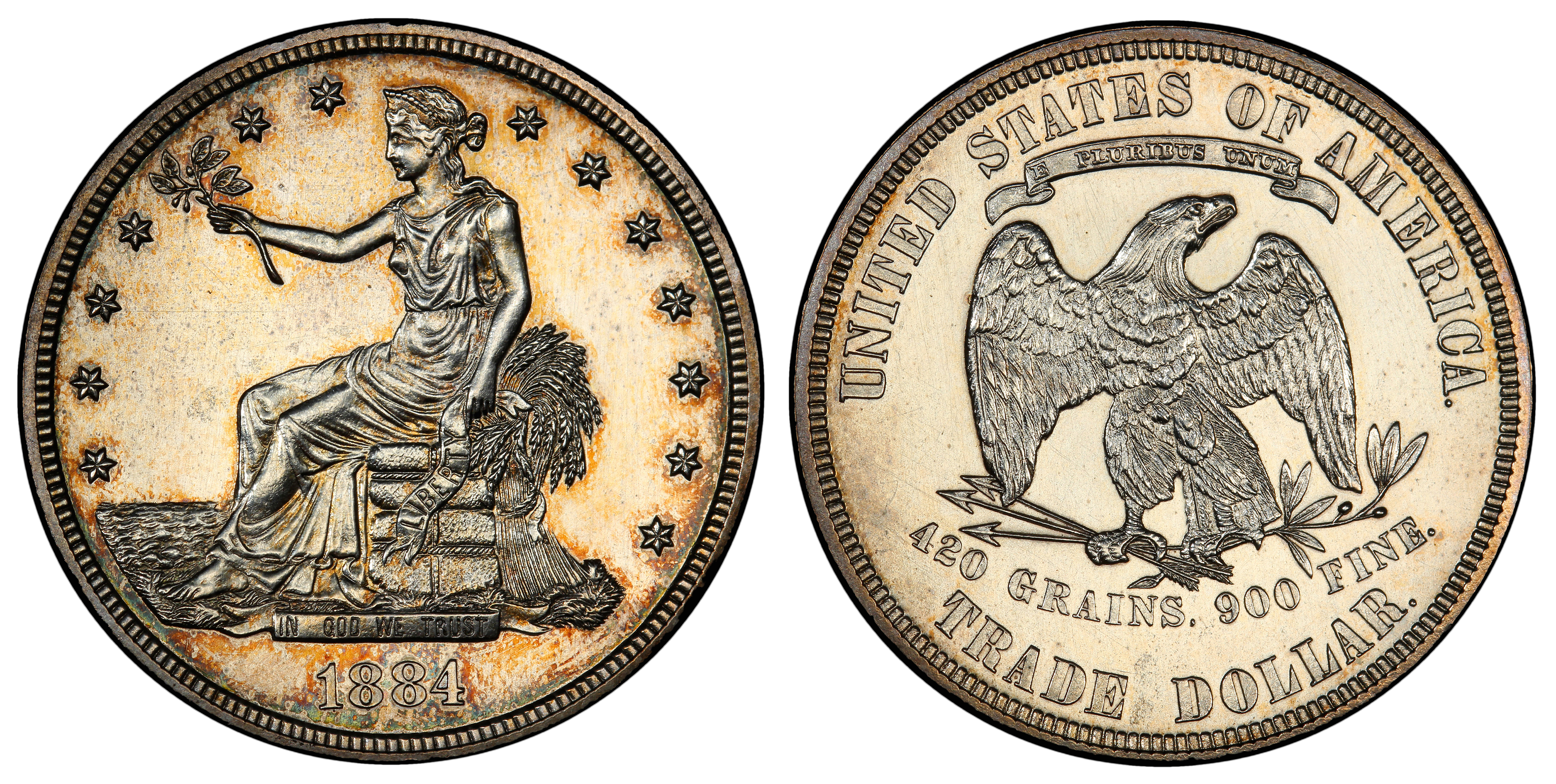
- Design: Left-facing seated Liberty, who extends her hand, bearing an olive branch, over the sea.
- Designer: William Barber
- Design date: 1873

Reverse
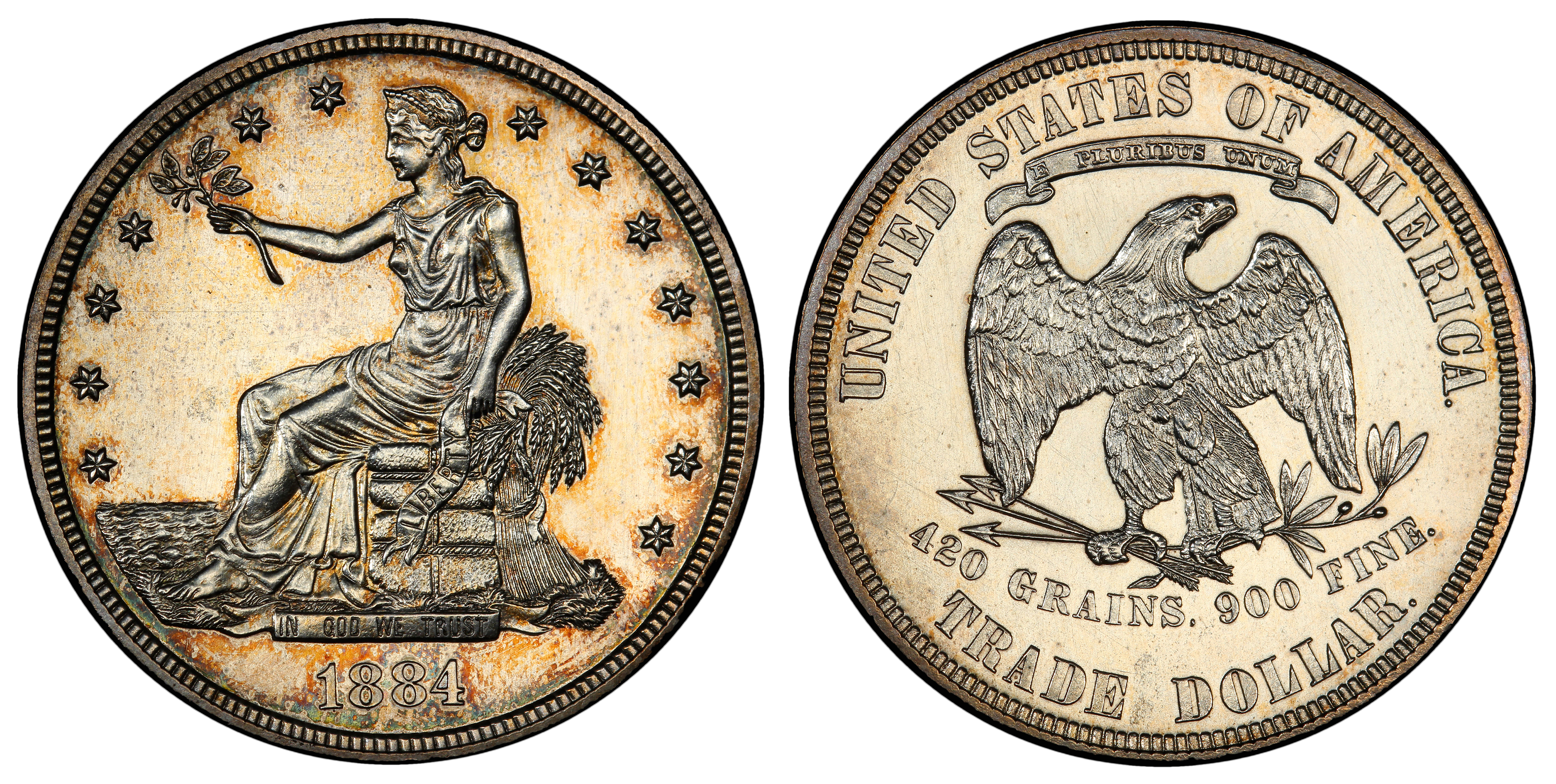
- Design: Bald eagle
- Designer: William Barber
- Design date: 1873

The United States trade dollar was a dollar coin minted by the United States Mint to compete with other large silver trade coins that were already popular in East Asia. The idea first came about in the 1860s, when the price of silver began to decline due to increased mining in the western United States. A bill providing in part for the issuance of the trade dollar was eventually put before Congress, where it was approved, and signed into law as the Coinage Act of 1873. The act made trade dollars legal tender up to five dollars. A number of designs were considered for the trade dollar, and an obverse and reverse created by William Barber were selected.

The first trade dollars were struck in 1873; the majority of these were sent to China. Eventually, bullion producers began converting large amounts of silver into trade dollars, causing the coins to make their way into American commercial channels. This caused frustration among those to whom they were given in payment, as the coins were largely maligned and traded for less than one dollar each. In response to their wide distribution in American commerce, the coins were officially demonetized in 1876, but continued to circulate. The production of business strikes ended in 1878, though proof coins officially continued to be minted until 1883. The trade dollar was re-monetized when the Coinage Act of 1965 was signed into law.

Trade coins are coins minted by a government, but not necessarily legal tender within the territory of the issuing country. These quasi-bullion coins (in rarer cases small change) were thus actually export goods—that is, bullion in the form of coins, used to buy goods from other countries.

== Background ==
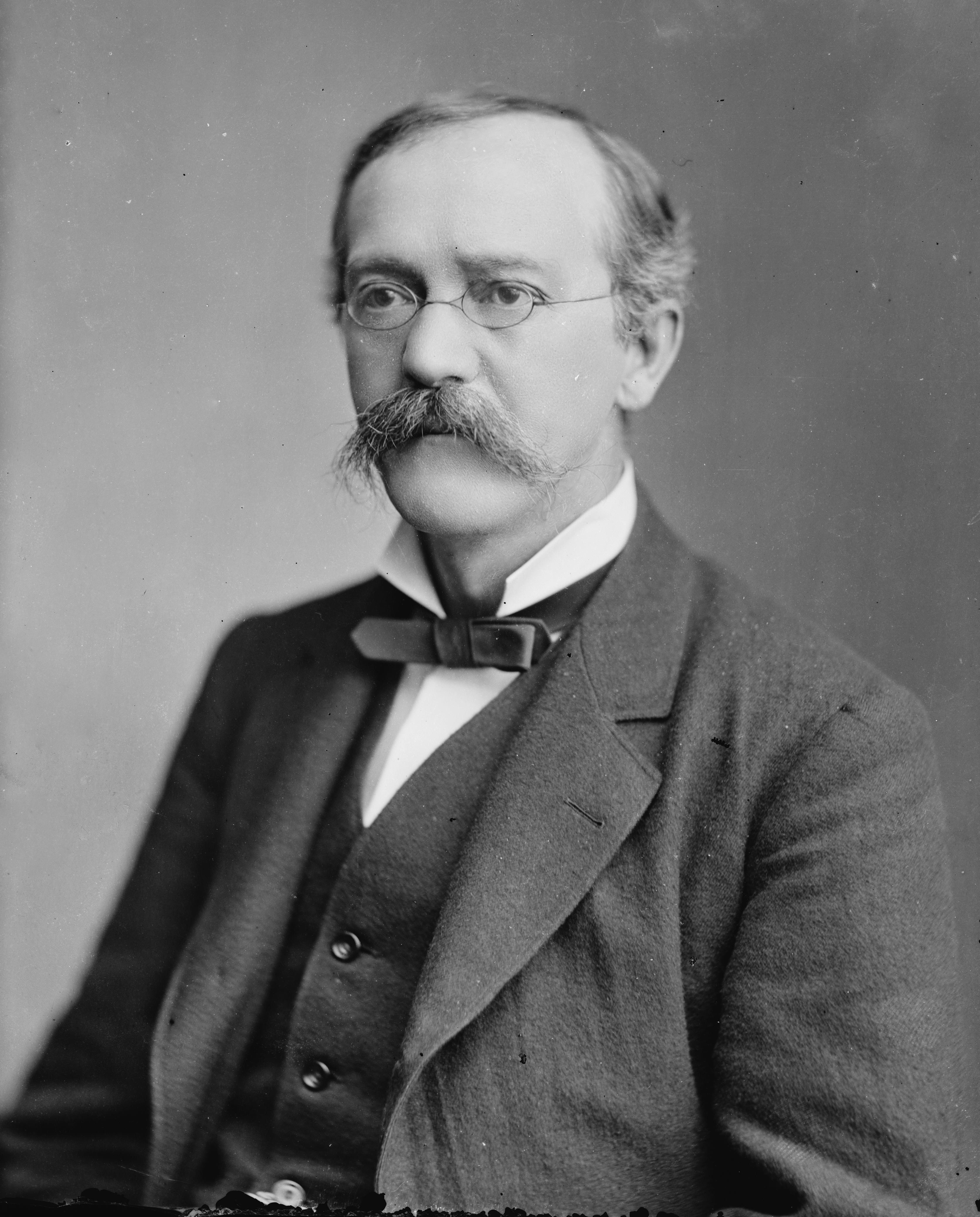
John Jay Knox popularized the idea of a dollar coin to compete with the Mexican dollar for use in East Asia.

Following the California gold rush that began in 1849 and the Australian gold rush that began in 1851, a larger amount of gold was put into commerce than could be easily absorbed by the normal channels. This resulted in a decrease in the value of gold and an increase in the relative value of silver. As a result, silver coins rapidly disappeared from circulation due either to hoarding or melting. In response, Congress authorized the Mint to reduce the quantity of silver in all denominations except the three-cent piece and silver dollar. Beginning in the 1860s, silver production rose and the price decreased. During this period, there was a notable decline in the circulation of silver coins, which were gradually replaced by copper and paper currency. This shift in currency composition resulted in a decrease in the availability and usage of silver coins within the monetary system. The reasons behind this transition varied and were influenced by a range of economic, political, and social factors. As a consequence, copper and paper currency gained prominence as the primary means of exchange, marking a significant change in the monetary landscape of the time.

In China, the Mexican peso (successor to the Spanish dollar) was greatly valued in commerce. However, the Chinese were sensitive to any changes in the coin's design, and were reluctant to accept newer coins due to a minor design change. The American silver dollar, 7.5 grains (0.49 g) lighter than its Spanish counterpart, was unpopular in East Asia due to its lower weight, forcing American merchants to purchase the Spanish or Mexican pieces to use in trade. Beginning in 1866, during the reign of Emperor Maximilian, the design was changed to show the Emperor's portrait; this caused widespread nonacceptance of the coins in China.

While conducting an investigation of the Mint at San Francisco, deputy comptroller of the currency John Jay Knox began discussing the monetary situation with Louis A. Garnett, a man who had worked as both the treasurer and assayer of the San Francisco Mint. Garnett recommended that the United States mint a commercial dollar that would be exported to East Asia to compete with other countries' silver trade coins that were already popular in that region. Garnett's rationale was that the majority of the coins would be hoarded or melted in Asia and would never be presented for redemption, allowing the government to make a profit from the seigniorage. During his time in San Francisco, Knox also discussed the proposed commercial dollar with Henry Linderman, who was working as a special agent for the Treasury Department at that time. In 1870, Knox wrote a report to the Treasury and wrote the draft for a bill on coinage. Knox's bill was approved by George Boutwell, Secretary of the Treasury. After modification and review from current and former government officials, the bill was put before Congress.

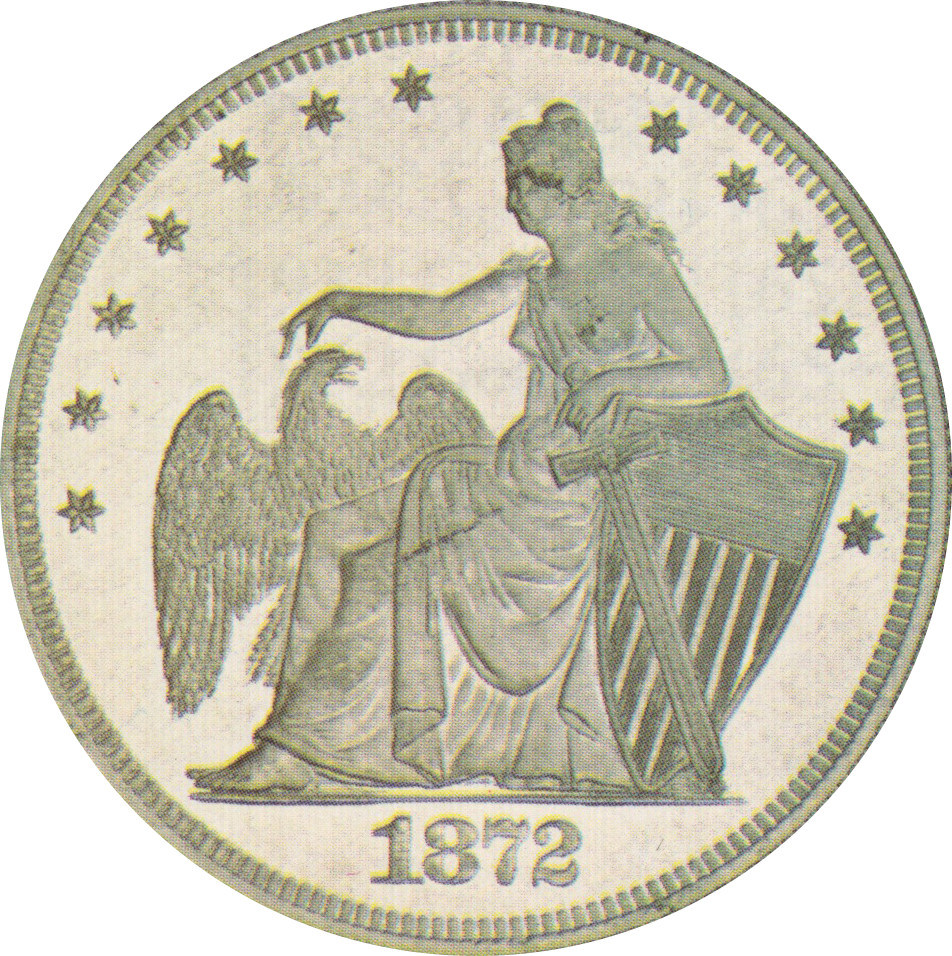
Designed by Mint Chief Engraver William Barber, this "Amazonian" design showing Columbia with an eagle was rejected by Mint authorities as too militaristic.

On November 19, 1872, while the coinage bill was still before Congress, Linderman made a report to the Secretary of the Treasury. In the report, Linderman argued that the coin need not hold legal tender status, and that it could simply be a piece of silver imprinted with its weight and fineness. Linderman also notes that such a product could supersede the Mexican dollar and eventually command a six to eight percent premium; at that time, American silver exported to East Asia was being sold at a two percent discount. Linderman proposed that the coin be named the "silver union" in order to distinguish it from the standard coins then in production.

In February 1872, the bill was amended by a House of Representatives committee to include authorization for a commercial dollar weighing 420 grains (27 g); but this proposal was replaced three months later when the House voted to include provisions for the production of a standard silver dollar weighing 384 grains (24.9 g). While in the Senate, the bill was again amended to require the Treasury to coin a trade dollar of 420 grains (27 g), as had been done earlier in the House. The revised bill, which came to be known as the Coinage Act of 1873, was approved in the House and Senate and was signed by President Ulysses S. Grant on February 12, 1873.

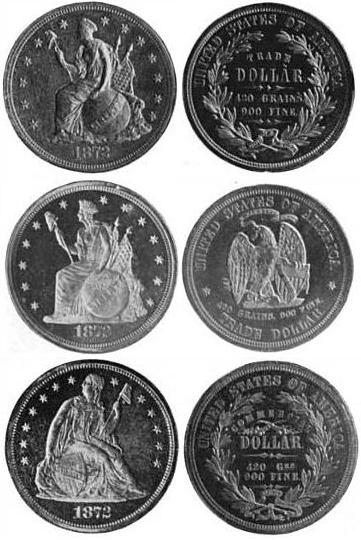
Patterns for the Trade Dollar.

The bill provided, in part, for the striking of trade dollars which held legal tender status up to five dollars. The legal tender provision was added by a last-minute rider at the behest of silver interests. At the insistence of Ohio Senator John Sherman, the weight and fineness of the piece was indicated on the reverse, an attribution which numismatic historian Don Taxay found incomprehensible as "Chinese merchants would never understand them".

Prior to the passage of the Coinage Act, the director of the Philadelphia Mint oversaw all branch mints. After the Act, the office of director was transferred to Washington, D.C., and responsibility for each mint was handed over to a superintendent.

=== Design selection ===
Throughout the year of 1872, the Mint struck a series of commercial dollar patterns in anticipation of the passage of the coinage bill. Production of patterns continued into 1873, but the denomination of the pattern coins was changed from "commercial dollar" to "trade dollar" before the bill was signed into law. After passage of the Coinage Act, Linderman met with Director of the Mint James Pollock to discuss the design of the newly authorized trade dollar. The two men agreed to request a jewelry and engraving firm, Bailey Banks & Biddle of Philadelphia, to create designs that would be compared to those already created by Chief Engraver William Barber.

After examining the designs of both parties, Linderman ordered that the design would depict a seated figure representing Liberty facing to the viewer's left, representing the direction of East Asia. Linderman apparently selected the designs from two different patterns. In June 1873, Linderman reviewed the various patterns created by Barber; he chose an obverse which one contemporary reporter described as "a female figure seated on bales of merchandise, holding in her left hand a scroll bearing the word 'Liberty'. At her back is a sheaf of wheat, expressing, with the bales of goods, the commercial character of the coin: the right hand extended holds the olive branch." The selected reverse depicts the bald eagle as required by law. The eagle has three arrows in the right claw and an olive branch in the left, a reversal to most other U.S. silver coins of the era. A set of six patterns, four with variations on the adopted obverse, and two showing portraits of Liberty, was sold by the Mint to the general public in limited quantities.

== Production ==
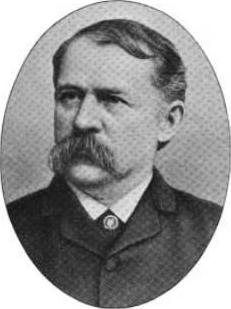
Coiner A. Loudon Snowden formally complained that the high points of the trade dollar were not being fully struck.

Linderman assumed the position of Director of the Mint and Pollock became Superintendent of the Philadelphia Mint. In July 1873, production began on the dies needed to strike the coins. During this time, in a telegram to Pollock, Linderman asked that production of trade dollars be hastened because Mexico was preparing to issue another series of dollars with the older design popular in Asia, a design that was discontinued in 1866. The first trade dollars were struck during a ceremony held on July 11, 1873. Forty thousand pieces were issued in the first release, on July 14. The Carson City Mint received its first dies for the new coins on July 22, and those intended for the San Francisco Mint arrived shortly after. In total, 396,635 business strikes and 865 proof coins were struck at the Philadelphia Mint during the first year of production. The Carson City and San Francisco mints struck 124,500 and 703,000 coins respectively.

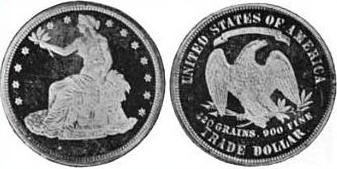
The experimental reverse design created by Anthony C. Paquet paired with a dateless obverse. Linderman approved the design, but did not implement it due to fears of Chinese disapproval of a new and unfamiliar design.

There were complaints that year from officials at all three of the mints concerning the quality of the coins produced. In the summer of 1874, coiner A. Loudon Snowden issued a formal complaint to Pollock about the quality of the strikings, most notably on the high points of the design; Barber began modifying the design later that year, reducing the relief. The modified dies began service in 1875. In the fall of that year, Linderman suggested that the reverse of the trade dollar should be altered in 1876 to commemorate the centennial of American independence; Pollock opposed the idea, noting that such a change would be difficult to carry out because Congressional approval would be necessary and that it might cause the coin to lose favor in East Asia. In May 1876, former assistant engraver Anthony C. Paquet created a reverse die after being hired by Linderman to improve the striking quality of the coins. Linderman approved of the new design, but it was ultimately rejected by Mint officials due to fears of Chinese disapproval.

Though production of business strikes ended in 1878, the striking of proof coins continued in limited numbers until 1883, when the final 979 coins were minted at the Philadelphia Mint. In 1908, it was discovered that ten proofs dated 1884 and five dated 1885 had been produced, but they are not listed in official records and it is not known when they were created.

== Reception ==
Most of the 1873 production was exported to China. In October of that year, the Tongzhi Emperor had an assay test conducted on the coins. In a proclamation translated by Chinese consul and interpreter Walter Hillier, the Emperor stated:

This Proclamation, therefore, is for the information of you merchants, traders, soldiers and people of every district. You must know that the 'Eagle Trade Dollar' that has lately come to Hong Kong has been jointly assayed by officers specially appointed for the purpose, and it can be taken in payment of duties, and come into general circulation. You must not look upon it with suspicion. At the same time rogues, sharpers, and the like, are hereby strictly forbidden to fabricate spurious imitations of this new Eagle Dollar, with a view to their own profit.
And should they dare to set this prohibition at defiance, and fabricate false coin, they shall, upon discovery, most assuredly be arrested and punished. Let every one obey with trembling! Let there be no disobedience!

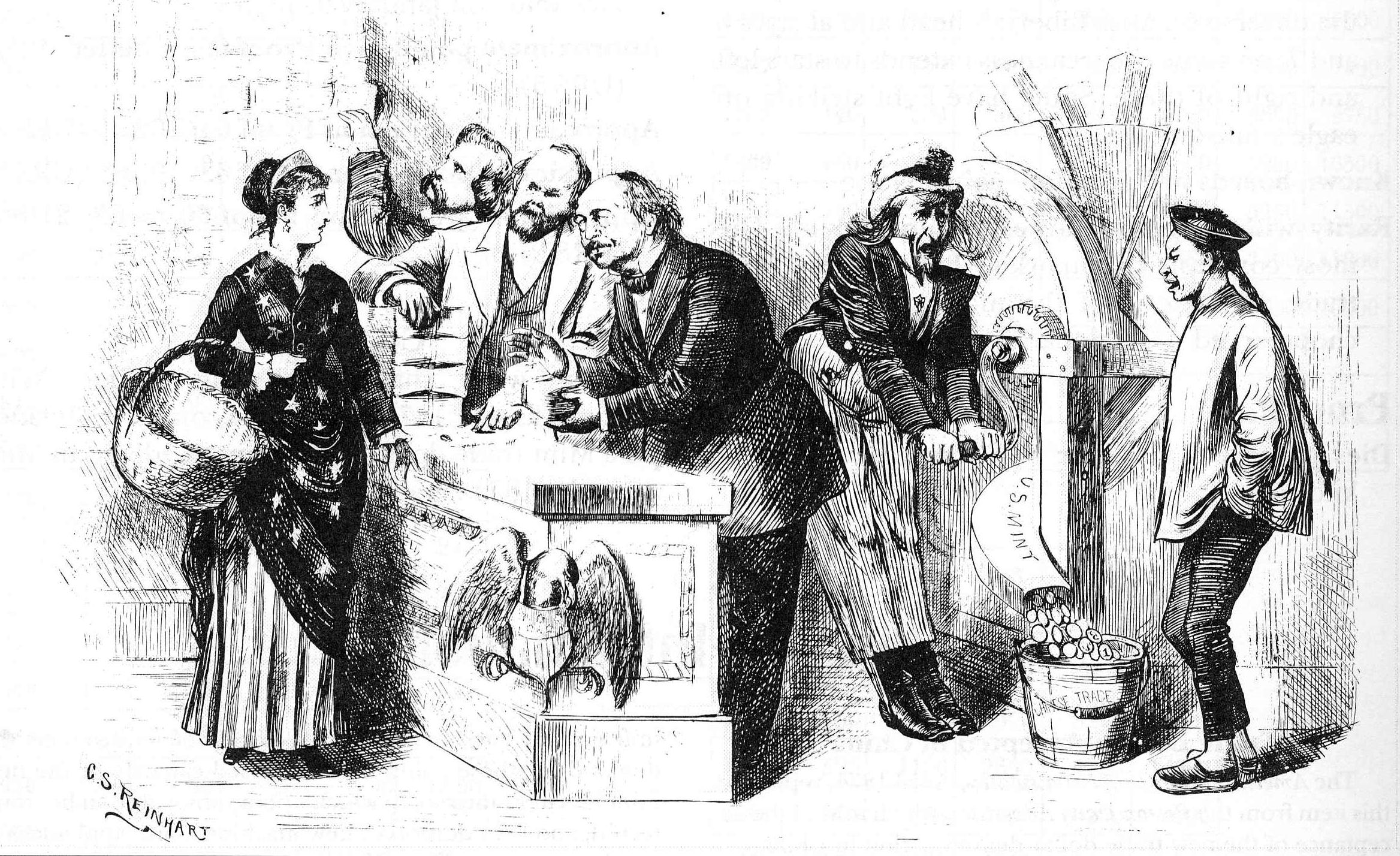
A political cartoon published in the April 25, 1874 issue of Harper's Weekly. Entitled "Rags for Our Working Men—Specie for the Foreigners", the caption for this cartoon reads "Columbia: Dear me, I do think it very wrong that the good nice trade dollar (worth 100 cents) should be sent out of the country for the benefit of the 'heathen Chinee,' for if these gentlemen are permitted to have their own way, it will take a basket full of greenbacks (worth —?) to buy dinner for my children."

In 1874, trade dollars began appearing in American commerce. In early 1875, Congress passed the Specie Redemption Act, allowing the Treasury to pay out silver coins in exchange for paper currency. That act, combined with a drop in the price of silver, caused hoarded or exported silver coins to reappear in commerce within the United States. Many trade dollars were reimported, especially to California. After the value of silver began to decline and the intrinsic value of the coins fell below one dollar, bullion depositors began having their silver struck as trade dollars and selling them wholesale to be distributed throughout the country. Bullion producers opted to coin their silver into trade dollars because the Coinage Act of 1873 specified that silver brought to the Mint could only be struck as such or cast into bars.

Congress considered raising the five-dollar legal tender limit on trade dollars, but instead passed a bill that officially demonetized the trade dollar on July 22, 1876; the Secretary of the Treasury was directed by the act to strike no more of the coins than necessary for use in trade. Despite the demonetization of the trade dollar, bullion producers continued to place the coins into the American market, resulting in an estimated seven million coins circulating within the United States, of which more than four million were placed in circulation in 1877. Despite the 1876 act, it was not until October 15, 1877, that Sherman (now Secretary of the Treasury) finally ordered that the mints not accept orders for trade dollars. On November 5, apparently believing a false report that additional supplies were needed for the Chinese New Year, he rescinded his order, finally ending orders for trade dollars on February 22, 1878.

Linderman ordered a review of the success of the trade dollar in China. It was discovered that the coins circulated reasonably well in southern China, but usage in the north was limited. One reason the trade dollar succeeded, for a while was due to a shortage of Mexican dollars due to civil unrest in that country. After the Mexican mints were able to ramp up production again then the U.S. trade dollar fell to the wayside as it was well-known and preferred in China. As the price of silver decreased, employers in the United States began paying workers in trade dollars purchased at a discount. The situation frustrated the public, as the coins were widely disliked (and demonitized in 1876) and many banks and businesses refused to accept them. In response, many towns, mostly in the western states, set a fixed value on trade dollars. Businesses which did accept trade dollars to avoid offending customers could not deposit them in banks or use them to pay taxes, and sold them to brokers. The brokers in turn recirculated the coins by selling them at a discount from face value to employers who included them in workers' pay packets. In 1883, members of the New York Mercantile Exchange petitioned Congress to allow redemption of the coins by the government.

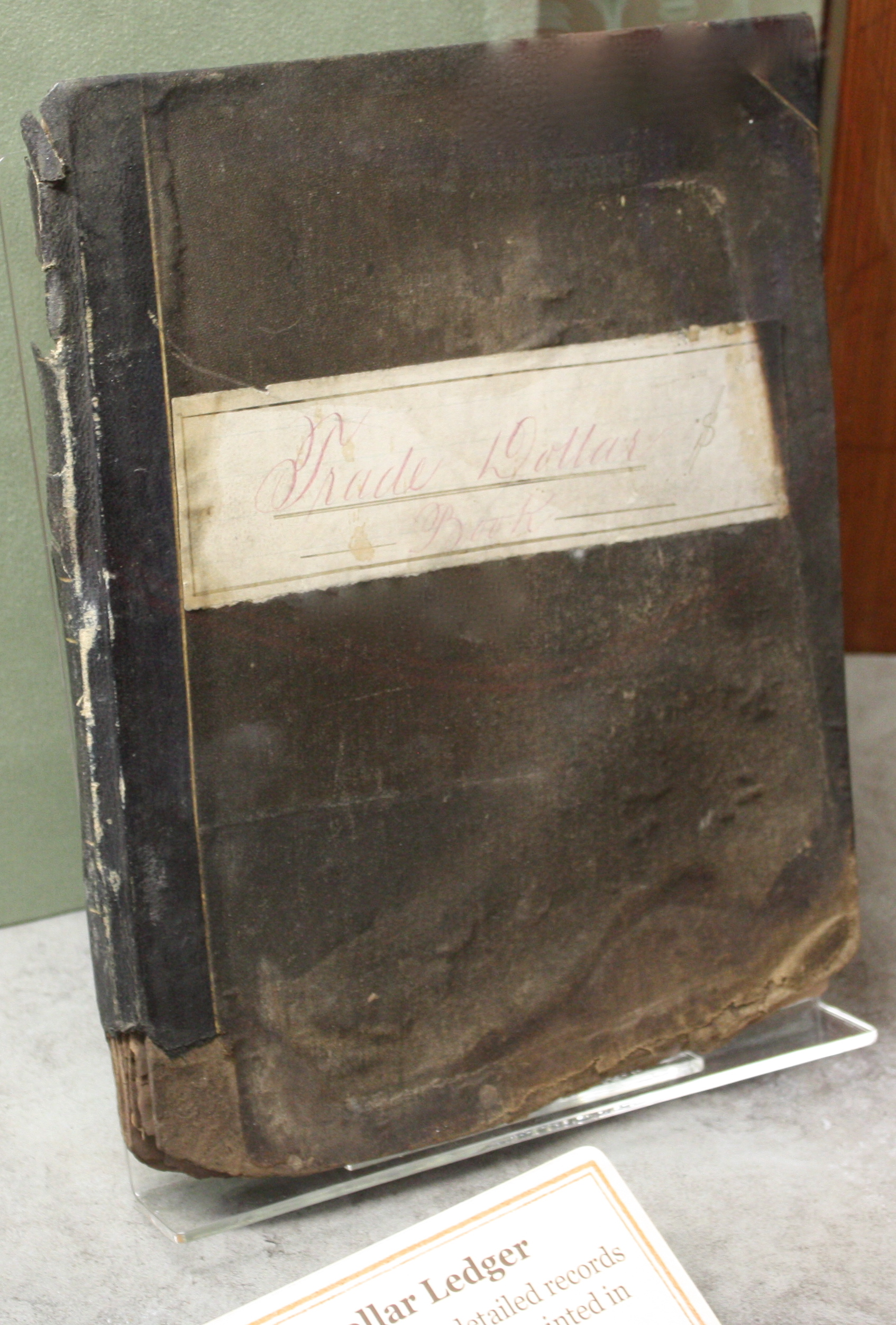
The Carson City Mint's trade dollar ledger book

Bullion prices continued to drop through the 1880s, increasing the loss by anyone forced to sell at melt value after accepting a trade dollar at face value. Despite the support of Secretary of the Treasury Charles J. Folger, the question of the redemption of the trade dollar became caught up in controversy over the heavy coinage of the new Morgan dollar under the inflationary Bland–Allison Act. Silver interests objected to the silver from redeemed trade dollars being counted towards the Mint's monthly quota under the act, preferring to sell newly mined silver instead, and opposed acts which so provided. It was not until 1887 that Congress, ostensibly to relieve the poor (though most trade dollars were by then in the hands of speculators), provided for the redemption of unmutilated trade dollars. The act, which did not count the redeemed silver towards the Bland–Allison Act quota, passed into law on February 14, 1887, when the ten-day period which President Grover Cleveland had to either sign or veto it expired with no action by the President. Many coins were not redeemable due to chop marks or holes applied by Chinese businessmen, which was done to affirm the coin's silver content. The dollars were only redeemable for six months, and the recovered silver was struck into dimes, quarters, and half dollars.

Numismatic historian Walter Breen criticized both the legal tender provision and the coin in general, stating that the coin's issuance was "an expensive mistake – its motivation mere greed, its design a triumph of dullness, its domestic circulation and legal tender status a disastrous provision of law leading only to ghastly abuses." During the 1870s an attempt by Japan to introduce its own trade dollar to China fared no better.

Trade dollars were again made legal tender by the Coinage Act of 1965, which stated in part "All coins and currencies of the United States (including Federal Reserve notes and circulating notes of Federal Reserve banks and national banking associations), regardless of when coined or issued, shall be legal tender for all debts, public and private, public charges, taxes, duties, and dues." However, in later years the numismatic and bullion value of any trade dollar came to far exceed its face value of one dollar. Because of demand by collectors, there are many counterfeits, many of which are well made out of metallic alloys roughly approximating the original.

== Bibliography ==
- Breen, Walter (1988). Walter Breen's Complete Encyclopedia of U.S. and Colonial Coins. New York, N.Y.: Doubleday. ISBN 978-0-385-14207-6. OL 4404444M.
- Evans, George G. (1887). Illustrated History of the United States Mint. Philadelphia: George G. Evans.
- Julian, R.W. (1993). Bowers, Q. David (ed.). Silver Dollars & Trade Dollars of the United States. Wolfeboro, New Hampshire: Bowers and Merena Galleries. ISBN 0-943161-48-7.
- Lange, David W. (2006). History of the United States Mint and its Coinage. Atlanta, GA: Whitman Publishing. ISBN 0-7948-1972-9.
- Linderman, Henry Richard (1879). Money and Legal Tender in the United States. New York, NY: G.P. Putnam's Sons.
- Taxay, Don (1983) [1966]. The U.S. Mint and Coinage. New York: Sanford J. Durst Numismatic Publications. ISBN 0-915262-68-1.
- Van Allen, Leroy C.; Mallis, A. George (1991). Comprehensive Catalog and Encyclopedia of Morgan & Peace Dollars. Virginia Beach, VA: DLRC Press. ISBN 1-880731-11-8.
- Vermeule, Cornelius (1971). Numismatic Art in America. Cambridge, MA: The Belknap Press of Harvard University Press. ISBN 0-674-62840-3.
- Yeoman, R.S. (2010). A Guide Book of United States Coins (63rd ed.). Atlanta, GA: Whitman Publishing. ISBN 978-0-7948-2767-0.

Preceded by Seated Liberty dollar	Dollar coin of the United States (1873–1885) Concurrent with: Seated Liberty dollar (1873); Large Head Indian Gold dollar – Type III (1873–1885); Morgan dollar (1878–1885)	Succeeded by Morgan dollar
