= William Kneass =

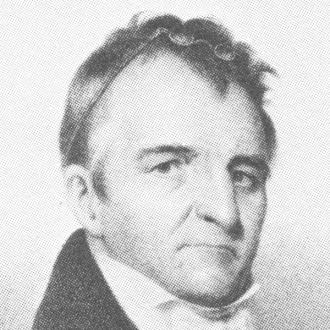

2nd Chief Engraver of the U.S. Mint
- In office January 29, 1824 – August 27, 1840
- President: John Quincy Adams; Andrew Jackson; Martin Van Buren
- Preceded by: Robert Scot
- Succeeded by: Christian Gobrecht

Personal details
- Born: September 25, 1780 Lancaster, Pennsylvania, US
- Died: August 27, 1840 (aged 59) Philadelphia, Pennsylvania, US
- Spouse: Mary Turner Honeyman Kneass
- Children: Samuel Honeyman; Strickland Kneass; 4 others
- Occupation: engraver

William Kneass (/ˈniːs/ "niece"; September 25, 1780 – August 27, 1840) was the second Chief Engraver of the United States Mint from 1824 until his death in 1840. Kneass is credited with designing the "Classic Head" motif, which appeared on numerous denominations of American currency, including the gold quarter eagle ($2.50) and half eagle ($5.00) gold pieces from 1834 to 1839. He also modified John Reich's "Capped Bust" design for use on the half dime through half-dollar from 1829 to 1837.

== Early life and career ==
William Kneass was born September 25, 1780, in Lancaster, Pennsylvania. He served in the War of 1812 as a volunteer associate of the field engineers, and helped construct fortifications on the western front of Philadelphia. He ran an engraving office in Philadelphia on Fourth above Chestnut Street, which was a popular meeting place for "leading wits and men of culture". Kneass also worked as an engraver of plates for bookwork. Although he mainly worked in line engraving, he was also known for producing aquatints. He also worked in two other engraving firms that bore his name: Kneass & Dellaker, and Young & Kneass & Co.

== Chief engraver of the U.S. Mint ==
On January 29, 1824, Kneass was appointed Chief Engraver of the United States Mint. During his tenure as Chief Engraver, he oversaw production of gold coinage, and circulating coinage.

In 1830, Kneass redesigned the quarter, and in 1834, redesigned the gold coinage. He also introduced a new Liberty head on the half dollar, a design that was modified several times over the next two years. In 1835, Mint director Samuel Moore wrote of him: "Mr. Kneass, our present engraver...is an acceptable, popular and very useful Officer, perhaps one of the most rapid in execution in the U. States. I do not know whether another could be found, whose celerity in his profession could have sufficed to furnish all the dies we have necessarily employed within the last five years."

On August 27 or 28, 1835, Kneass suffered a debilitating stroke that left him paralyzed on his right side.Once second engraver Christian Gobrecht was hired, he did most pattern and die work until Kneass died in office on August 27, 1840. Kneass was succeeded by Gobrecht as Chief Engraver on December 21 of that year.

== Personal life and legacy ==
Kneass was married to Mary Turner Honeyman Kneass. Two of their six children, Samuel Honeyman Kneass (1806–1858) and Strickland Kneass (1821–1884), became noted civil engineers in Philadelphia.

Kneass was remembered as "a warm gentleman of the old-school, who had the rare quality of engaging and winning the esteem and affection of children and youth."

== Bibliography ==
- Taxay, Don (1983). The U.S. Mint and Coinage (reprint of 1966 ed.). New York, N.Y.: Sanford J. Durst Numismatic Publications. ISBN 0-915262-68-1.

Government offices
Preceded by Robert Scot	Chief Engraver of the U.S. Mint; 1824–1840	Succeeded by Christian Gobrecht
