= Type set =

Coin collection based on design or type

A type set is a coin collection based on coin design or type. Traditional collections consist of all dates within a series such as state quarters or Lincoln cent.

Type sets are more popular for practicality and therefore are more common among younger or less wealthy coin collectors. Date sets are more common with more experienced and wealthy collectors, who focus on getting every year and minting of a series of coins.

== Description and varieties ==
A Type Set may contain the designs of only one denomination. For example, the dime has had 12 - 14 distinct designs. The definition of what constitutes a design is subjective but collectors generally follow those listed in the authoritative Red Book (A Guide Book of United States Coins), which says: "A series of coins defined by a shared distinguishing design, composition, denomination, and other elements. For example, Barber dimes or Franklin half dollars.". Professional numismatic associations such as PCGS (Professional Coin Grading Service) and NGC (Numismatic Guaranty Corporation) list around 140 entries in a complete set that includes copper, nickel, silver and gold.

A complete Type Set consists of every design of every denomination authorized by Congress that was struck for public usage. This excludes such items as pattern coins or coins struck for particular occasions. It includes denominations that are no longer in existence - half cent, the two-cent piece, the three-cent piece, the twenty-cent piece and all gold coins. Designs were changed for a variety of reasons - historical, political, cultural, and as a reaction to public opinion. The Standing Liberty Quarter first minted in 1916 was immediately redesigned when it was noted that Liberty's breast was visible. This change created a separate design. The Indian Head nickel (Buffalo) appeared in 1913 but the FIVE CENTS began wearing away. The coin was immediately changed to lower the buffalo mound. In 1837, the dime was minted without stars drawing outrage and the offending stars were immediately returned. The denomination "FIVE CENTS" was initially omitted on the V Nickel (the reverse carried a large V). Before the words could be added, enterprising tricksters gold-plated the coin and declared it a $5.00 gold piece. The Indian head cent has 3 varieties: (1) No shield (1859), (2) Copper and nickel (1860–1863) and (3) Bronze (1864–1909). A list of all members of a Type Set are listed below.

A complete type set of paper currency within a given scope of collecting (Note: Using United States paper currency as an example, different scopes or categories within which a complete type set may exist could include (but is not limited to) Fractional currency, Confederate currency, Colonial and Continental currency) includes a representative sample of each major design and change, but excludes lesser variations (e.g., signature combinations, Treasury seal, overprints, etc.).

Collectors build variations of the ultimate set. For example, many do not include gold due to the prohibitive cost; other now omit designs before the year 1800. These are the most expensive due to several factors: Poor quality of material, primitive machinery and working conditions, minuscule production numbers and general wear and loss after 200 years. Most designs cover decades but some were minted for only one or two years making these the rarest of the entire set. It is not a coincidence that many of these were also struck prior to 1800 when the Mint altered designs in response to unfavorable public opinion. The most famous of these short-lived designs are the half cent (1793), a quarter (1796), Draped Bust, Small Eagle half dollar (1796–1797) and the three large cent designs minted in 1793 - Wreath cent, Chain cent and Liberty Cap Cent. The Haig Koshkarian Type Set , one of the finest ever assembled, was auctioned in 2004.

== Examples - copper, nickel, silver, gold ==
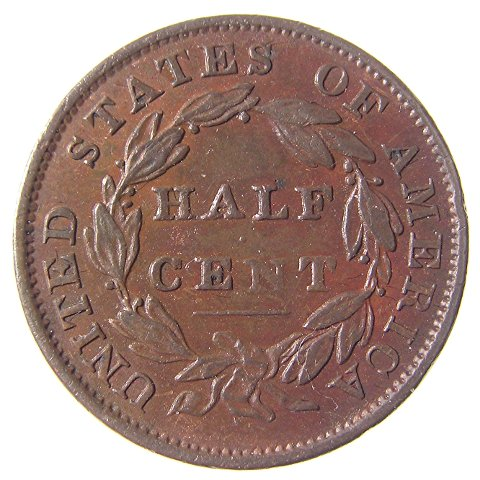
Half cent

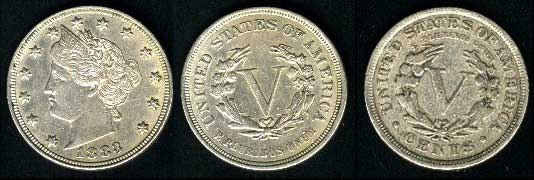
V-Nickel - with/without FIVE CENTS.

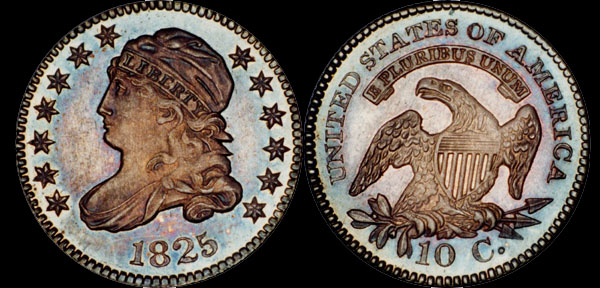
Capped Bust - this design was used for the half dime, dime, quarter and half dollar

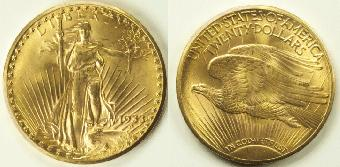
Saint-Gaudens Double Eagle

== Complete Type Sets - Silver / Copper / Bronze / Steel / Clad coins ==
Half Cent
Liberty Cap - Head Facing Left	Liberty Cap - Head Facing Right	Draped Bust	Classic Head	Braided Hair
1793	1794–1797	1800–1808	1809–1836	1840–1857

Large Cent
Flowing Hair - Chain Reverse	Flowing Hair - Wreath Reverse	Liberty Cap	Draped Bust	Classic Head	Liberty Head - Matron Head	Liberty Head - Matron Head Modified	Braided Hair
1793	1793	1793–1796	1796–1807	1808–1814	1816–1835	1835 - 1839	1839 - 1857

Small Cent
Flying Eagle	Indian Head - Laurel Wreath	Indian Head - Oak Wreath / Shield Copper/Nickel	Indian Head - Oak Wreath / Shield Bronze	Lincoln - Wheat Bronze	Lincoln - Wheat Steel	Lincoln - Memorial Copper Alloy	Lincoln - Memorial Copper-Plated Zinc	Lincoln - Bicentennial Series (4 Designs)	Lincoln - Shield
1856 -1858	1859	1860 - 1864	1864 - 1909	1909 - 1942; 1944 - 1958	1943	1959 - 1982	1982 - 2008	2009	2010 - Date

Two Cents
1864 - 1873

Three Cents
Silver Type 1	Silver Type 2	Silver Type 3	Nickel
1851–1853	1854–1858	1859–1873	1865–1889

Nickel
Shield - Rays	Shield - No Rays	Liberty Head - Type 1 Without "CENTS"	Liberty Head - Type 2 With "CENTS"	Buffalo - Type 1 Raised Ground	Buffalo - Type 2 Recessed Ground	Jefferson - Without Initials	Jefferson - Wartime Silver Alloy	Jefferson - With Initials	Jefferson - Westward Journey (4 Designs)	Jefferson - Forward Facing
1866–1867	1867–1883	1883	1883–1913	1913	1913–1938	1938 - 1942; 1946 - 1965	1942–1945	1966 - 2003	2004 - 2005	2006 - DATE

Half Dime
Flowing Hair	Draped Bust - Small Eagle	Draped Bust - Heraldic Eagle	Capped Bust	Seated Liberty - No Stars	Seated Liberty - Stars	Seated Liberty - Arrows at Date	Seated Liberty - Legend On Obverse
1794–1795	1796–1797	1800–1805	1829–1837	1837 - 1838	1838 - 1853; 1856 - 1859	1853 - 1855	1860 - 1873

Dime
Draped Bust - Small Eagle	Draped Bust - Heraldic Eagle	Capped Bust - Wide Border	Capped Bust - Modified Design	Seated Liberty - No Stars	Seated Liberty - Stars / No Drapery	Seated Liberty - Stars / Drapery	Seated Liberty - Arrows At Date	Seated Liberty - Legend On Obverse	Seated Liberty - Arrows At Date #2
1796–1797	1798–1807	1808–1828	1828–1837	1837 - 1838	1838 - 1840	1840 - 1853; 1856 - 1860	1853 - 1855	1860 - 1873; 1875 - 1891	1873 - 1874
Barber	Mercury	Roosevelt - Silver	Roosevelt - Copper-Nickel Clad						
1892–1916	1916–1945	1946 - 1964	1965 - DATE						

Twenty Cents
1875–1878

Quarter
Draped Bust - Small Eagle	Draped Bust - Heraldic Eagle	Capped Bust - Large Diameter	Capped Bust - Reduced Diameter	Seated Liberty - Type 1: No Motto - No Drapery	Seated Liberty - Type 1: No Motto w/Drapery	Seated Liberty - Type 2: Arrows / Rays	Seated Liberty - Type 3: Arrows / No Rays	Seated Liberty - Type 4: Motto
1796	1804–1807	1815–1828	1831–1838	1838 - 1840; 1856 - 1866	1840 - 1853	1853	1854–1855	1866 - 1873; 1875 - 1891
Seated Liberty - Type 5: Arrows	Barber	Standing Liberty - Type 1 No Stars	Standing Liberty - Type 2 Stars / Pedestal Date	Standing Liberty - Type 2 Stars / Recessed Date	Washington - Silver	Washington - Copper/Nickel Clad	Washington - Bicentennial	Washington - States (50 Designs)
1873–1874	1892–1916	1916–1917	1917–1924	1925 - 1930	1932 - 1964	1965 - 1974; 1977 - 1998	1976	1999 - 2008
Washington - Territories (6 Designs)	Washington - America The Beautiful (56 Designs)	Washington - Crossing The Delaware	Washington - American Women (20 Designs)					
2009	2010 - 2021	2021	2022 - 2025					

Half Dollar
Flowing Hair	Draped Bust - Small Eagle	Draped Bust - Heraldic Eagle	Capped Bust - Lettered Edge First Style	Capped Bust - Lettered Edge Remodeled Portrait & Eagle	Capped Bust - Reeded Edge "50 Cents" On Reverse	Capped Bust - Reeded Edge "Half Dol" On Reverse
1794–1795	1796–1797	1801–1807	1807 - 1808	1809 - 1836	1836–1837	1838–1839
Seated Liberty - Type 1: No Motto	Seated Liberty - Type 2: Arrows / Rays	Seated Liberty - Type 3: Arrows / No Rays	Seated Liberty - Type 4: Motto	Seated Liberty - Type 5: Motto / Arrows		
1839 - 1853; 1856 - 1866	1853	1854–1855	1866–1873; 1875 - 1891	1873–1874		
Barber	Walking Liberty	Franklin	Kennedy Silver - 90%	Kennedy Silver Clad - 40%	Kennedy Copper/Nickel Clad	Kennedy - Bicentennial
1892–1915	1916–1947	1948–1963	1964	1965 - 1970	1971 - 1974; 1977 - DATE	1976

Dollar
Flowing Hair	Draped Bust - Small Eagle	Draped Bust - Heraldic Eagle	Gobrecht	Seated - No Motto	Seated - With Motto	Trade Dollar	Morgan
1794–1795	1795–1798	1798–1804	1836 - 1839	1840–1865	1866–1873	1873–1885	1878–1921
Peace	Eisenhower	Eisenhower - Bicentennial	Susan B. Anthony	Sacagawea / Native American	Presidential	American Innovation	
1921–1935	1971 - 1974; 1977 - 1978	1976	1979 - 1981; 1999	2000 - 2008 / 2009 - Date	2007 - 2016; 2020	2018 - DATE	

== Complete Type Sets - Gold coins ==
Dollar (Gold)			
Liberty Head - Open Wreath	Liberty Head - Closed Wreath	Indian Princess - Small	Indian Princess - Large
1849	1849 - 1854	1854 - 1856	1856 - 1889

Quarter Eagle ($2.50 - Gold)
Capped Bust - Facing Right No Stars	Capped Bust - Facing Right With Stars	Cappted Bust - Facing Left	Capped Head - Facing Left Large Diameter	Capped Head - Facing Left Reduced Diameter	Classic Head	Liberty Head	Indian Head
1796	1796–1807	1808	1821–1827	1829–1834	1834–1839	1840–1907	1908–1929

Indian Princess Head ($3.00 - Gold)
1854–1889

Stella ($4.00 - Gold)
1879–1880

Half Eagle ($5.00 - Gold)
Capped Bust - Facing Right Small Eagle	Capped Bust - Facing Right Heraldic Eagle	Draped Bust - Facing Left	Capped Head - Facing Left Large Diameter	Capped Head - Facing Left Reduced Diameter	Classic Head	Liberty Head - No Motto	Liberty Head - With Motto	Indian Head
1795–1798	1795–1807	1807 - 1809	1813 - 1829	1829 - 1834	1834–1838	1839–1866	1866–1908	1908–1929

Eagle ($10.00 - Gold)
Capped Bust - Small Eagle	Capped Bust - Heraldic Eagle	Liberty Head - No Motto	Liberty Head - With Motto	Indian Head - No Motto	Indian Head - With Motto
1795–1797	1797–1804	1838–1866	1866–1907	1907–1908	1908–1933

Double Eagle ($20.00 - Gold)
Liberty Head - No Motto	Liberty Head - With Motto / "Twenty D."	Liberty Head - With Motto / "TWENTY DOLLARS"	St. Gaudens - No Motto Roman Numerals	St. Gaudens - No Motto Arabic Numerals	St. Gaudens - With Motto
1849–1866	1866–1876	1877–1907	1907 - 1908	1907–1908	1908–1933
