= Penny (United States coin) =

Current lowest-value American coin

One cent
- United States
- Value: 0.01 U.S. dollar
- Mass: (1982–present) 2.5 g (0.08 troy oz)
- Diameter: 19.05 mm (0.75 in)
- Thickness: 1.52 mm (0.0598 in)
- Edge: Plain
- Composition: (1982–present) copper-plated zinc 97.5% Zn, 2.5% Cu
- Years of minting: 1793–present (since 2026 produced for collectors only)

Obverse
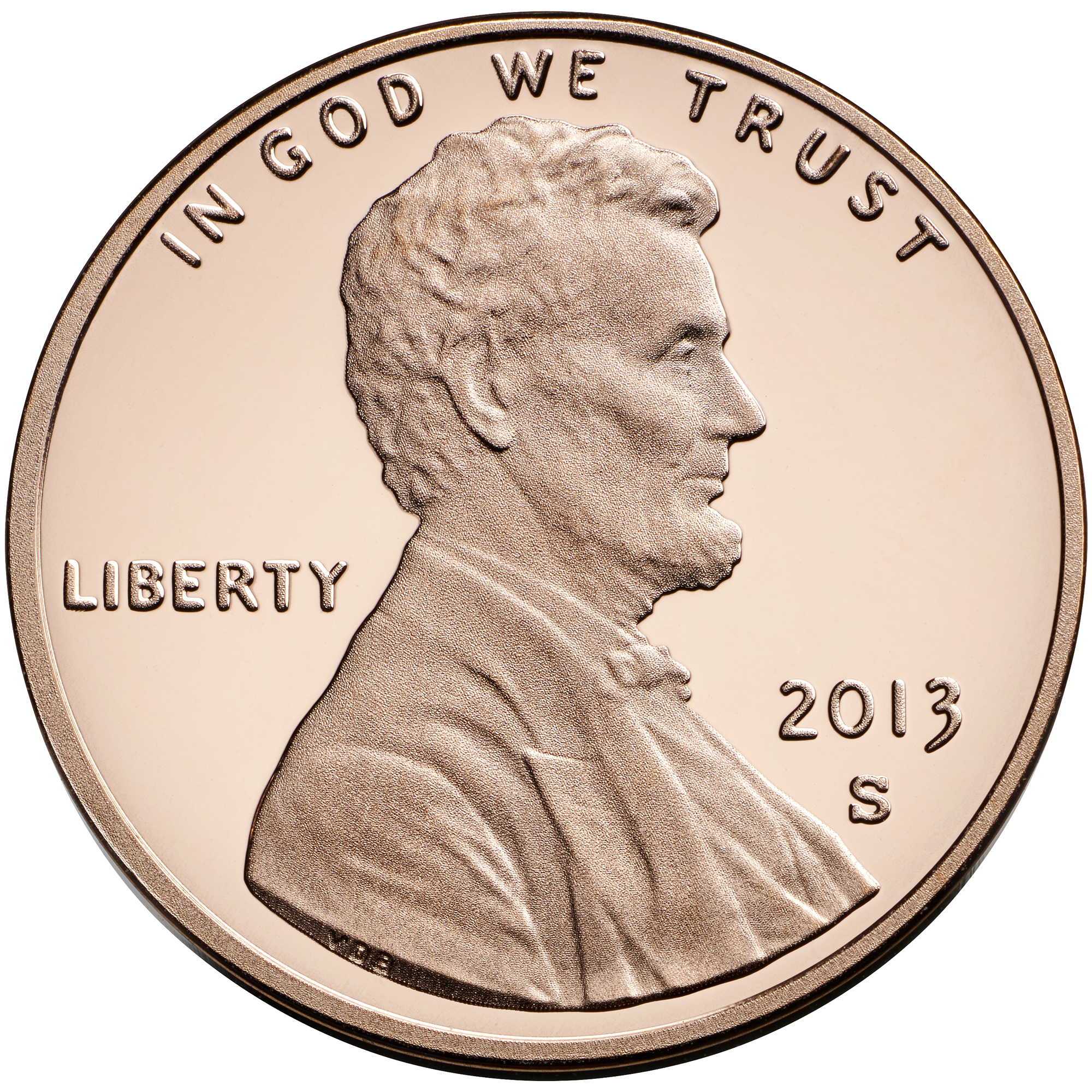
- Design: Abraham Lincoln
- Designer: Victor D. Brenner
- Design date: 1909; 117 years ago

Reverse
- Design: Union Shield
- Designer: Lyndall Bass
- Design date: 2010–present

The penny, officially "one cent", is a United States coin worth one cent, equal to 1/100 of a dollar ($0.01). It has been the lowest face-value coin or banknote of U.S. currency since the abolition of the half-cent coin in 1857. (Note: The abstract mill, which has never been minted, equal to a tenth of a cent, continues to see limited use in the fields of taxation and finance.) Introduced in 1793, it has only been produced for collectors since 2026.

The United States Mint's official name for the coin is "cent" and the U.S. Treasury's official name is "one cent piece". However, the United States Mint primary refers to the coin as a "penny" on its website. The colloquial term penny derives from the British coin of the same name, which occupies a similar place in the British system. Pennies is the plural form, not to be confused with pence, which refers to the unit of currency.

The first U.S. cent was produced in 1787, and the cent has been issued primarily as a copper or copper-plated coin throughout its history. In 1792, Congress established the U.S. Mint, which began producing coins. In the same year, the Coinage Act of 1792 mandated that the penny be valued at one hundredth part of a dollar and contain precisely eleven penny-weights of copper. In March 1793, the newly established Mint in Philadelphia distributed the first set of circulating U.S. currency – 11,178 copper cents.

The penny was issued in its current form as the Lincoln cent, with its obverse featuring the profile of President Abraham Lincoln since 1909, the centennial of his birth. From 1959 (the sesquicentennial of Lincoln's birth) to 2008, the reverse featured the Lincoln Memorial. Four different reverse designs in 2009 honored Lincoln's 200th birthday and a new, "permanent" reverse – the Union Shield – was introduced in 2010. The coin is 0.75 inches (19.05 mm) in diameter and 0.0598 inches (1.52 mm) in thickness. The current copper-plated zinc cent issued since 1982 weighs 2.5 grams, while the previous 95% copper cent still found in circulation weighed 3.11 g.

In the early 2010s, the price of metal used to make pennies rose to a noticeable cost to the mint which peaked at more than 2¢, a negative seigniorage, for the 1¢ face-value coin. This pushed the mint to again look for alternative metals for the coin. Due to inflation, a single penny has lost virtually all its purchasing power. The coin was viewed as a burden to businesses, banks, government (especially mints) and the public in general; one survey found that 2 percent of Americans throw pennies in the trash. Debate mounted over eliminating the coin, which can only be done through an act of Congress.

In November 2025, the mint suspended the production of pennies for circulation while continuing to mint annual sets of pennies for collectors. The decision was largely due to cost, and would be codified into law by the Common Cents Act, passed by Congress in September 2026. The Common Cents Act permits, but does not require, businesses to round cash payments to the nearest five cents (nickel) if exact change is unavailable. The penny remains legal tender and in circulation.

== History of composition ==
The composition of the penny has varied over time:

Years	Material	Weight (grains)	Weight (grams)
1793–1795	~100% copper	208 gr	13.5 g
1795–1857	~100% copper	168 gr	10.9 g
1856–1864	88% copper, 12% nickel (also known as NS-12)	72 gr	4.7 g
1864–1942	bronze (95% copper, 5% tin and zinc)	48 gr	3.1 g
1943	zinc-coated steel (also known as 1943 steel cent)	42 gr	2.7 g
1944–1946	gilding metal (95% copper, 5% zinc)	48 gr	3.1 g
1947–1962	bronze (95% copper, 5% tin and zinc)	48 gr	3.1 g
1962 – September 1982	gilding metal (95% copper, 5% zinc)	48 gr	3.1 g
October 1982 – present	copper-plated zinc (97.5% zinc, 2.5% copper)	38.6 gr	2.50 g

The isotope composition of early coins spanning the period 1828 to 1843 reflects the copper from Cornish ores from England, while coins after 1850 reflect the Keweenaw Peninsula, Michigan ores, a finding consistent with historical records.

In 1943, at the peak of World War II, zinc-coated steel cents were made for a short time because of war demands for copper. A few copper cents from 1943 were produced from 1942 planchets remaining in the bins. Similarly, some 1944 steel cents have been confirmed. From 1944 to 1946, salvaged ammunition shells made their way into the minting process, and it was not uncommon to see coins featuring streaks of brass or having a considerably darker finish than other issues.

In the early 1970s, the price of copper rose to the point where the cent contained almost one cent's worth of copper. This led the mint to test alternative metals, including aluminum and bronze-clad steel. Aluminum was chosen, and over 1.5 million samples of the 1974 aluminum cent were struck before ultimately being rejected.

The cent's composition was changed in 1982 because the value of the copper in the coin started to rise above one cent. Some 1982 cents used the 97.5% zinc composition, while others used the 95% copper composition. United States cents minted after 1982 have been zinc with copper plating. The bronze and copper cents can be distinguished from the newer zinc cents by dropping the coins on a solid surface, or by flipping them in the air with one's thumb. The predominantly zinc coins make a lower-pitched "clunk" when hitting the surface, and make no sound when flipped in the air; while the copper coins produce a higher-pitched ringing sound. A full 50-cent roll of pre-1982–83 coins weighs 5.4 oz (150 g) compared to a post-1982–83 roll which weighs 4.4 oz (120 g).

== Designs ==
The coin has gone through several designs over its two-hundred-year time frame. The original cent coin manufactured by the U.S. Mint featured Lady Liberty. One design featuring Lady Liberty was cut by Henry Voigt, but these coins were likely experimental, and did not enter circulation. William Russel Birch is believed to have been the artist who rendered the flowing hair design of Lady Liberty on the original cut cent.

Until 1857, it was about the size of the current U.S. dollar coins, Susan B. Anthony to present dollars. Shown below are the different cent designs that have been produced; mintage figures can be found at United States cent mintage figures.

Large cents:

- Flowing Hair Chain 1793
- Flowing Hair Wreath 1793
- Liberty Cap 1793–1796
- Draped Bust 1796–1807
- Classic Head 1808–1814
- Coronet 1816–1839
- Braided Hair 1839–1857, 1868 (Note: The 1868 large cent was not a regular issue coin.)

Small cents:

- Flying Eagle cent (1856–1858)
- Indian Head cent (1859–1909)
- Lincoln cent (1909–present)
  - Lincoln Wheat (1909–1958)
  - Lincoln Memorial (1959–2008)
  - Lincoln Bicentennial 4 reverse designs (2009)
  - Lincoln Union Shield (2010–present)

A cent coin has been stamped with every year since 1793 except for 1815. Shipments of copper planchets from the United Kingdom were embargoed during the War of 1812, and the mint's supply was exhausted in October 1814. Cent coins resumed minting in December 1815, though it is not clear whether these were stamped 1814 or 1816.

Throughout its history, the Lincoln cent has featured several typefaces for the date, but most of the digits have been old-style numerals, except with the 4 and 8 neither ascending nor descending. The only significant divergence is that the small 3 was non-descending (the same size as a 0, 1, or 2) in the early history, before switching to a descending, large 3 for the year 1934 and then permanently (as of 2014) in 1943. Similarly, the digit 5 was small and non-descending up to 1945.

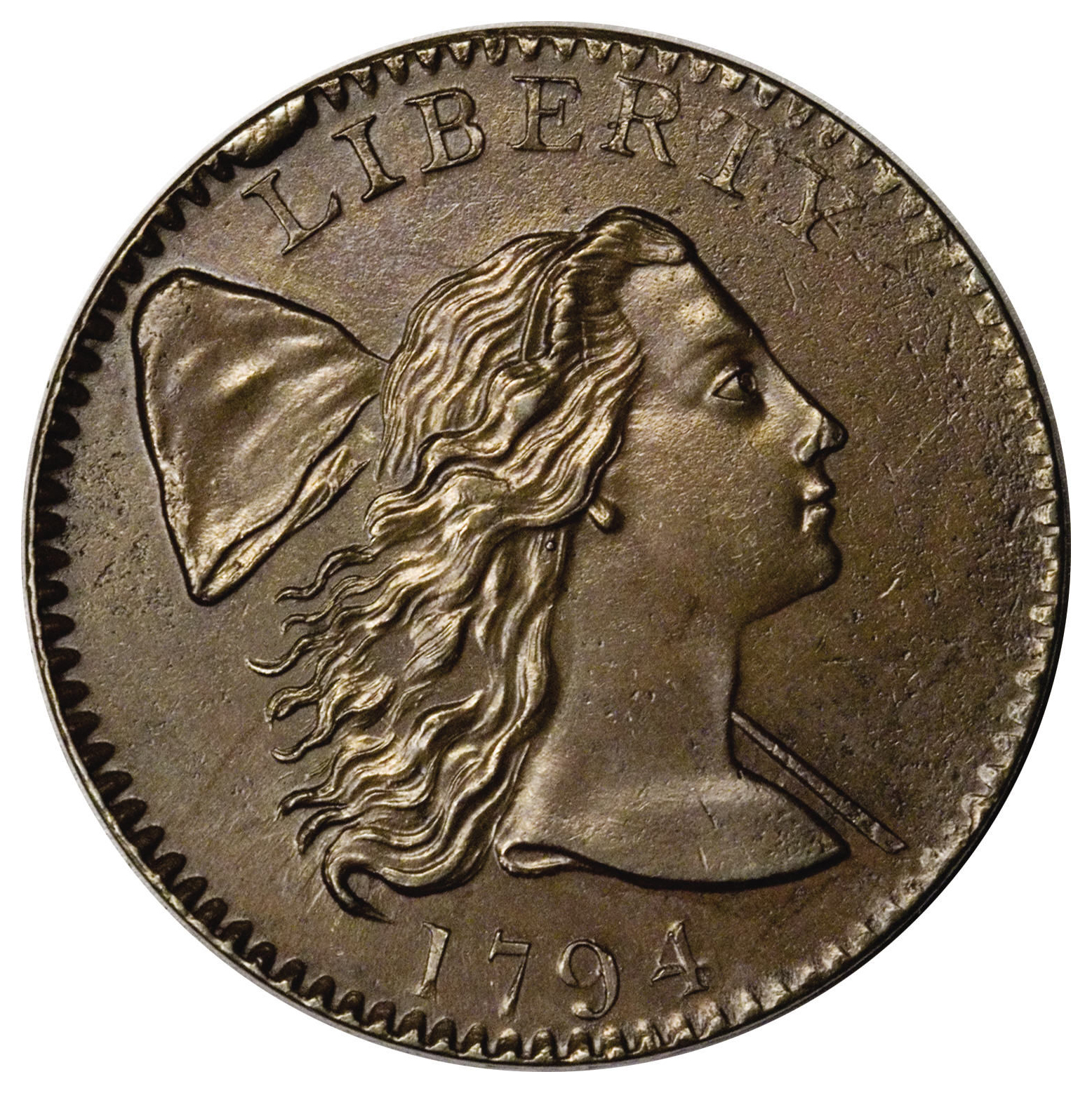
Liberty Cap cent, 1794

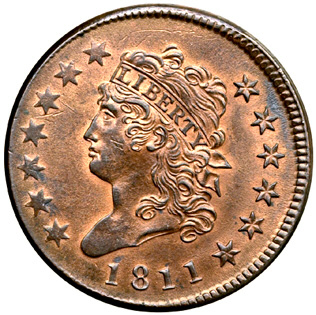
Classic Head cent, 1811

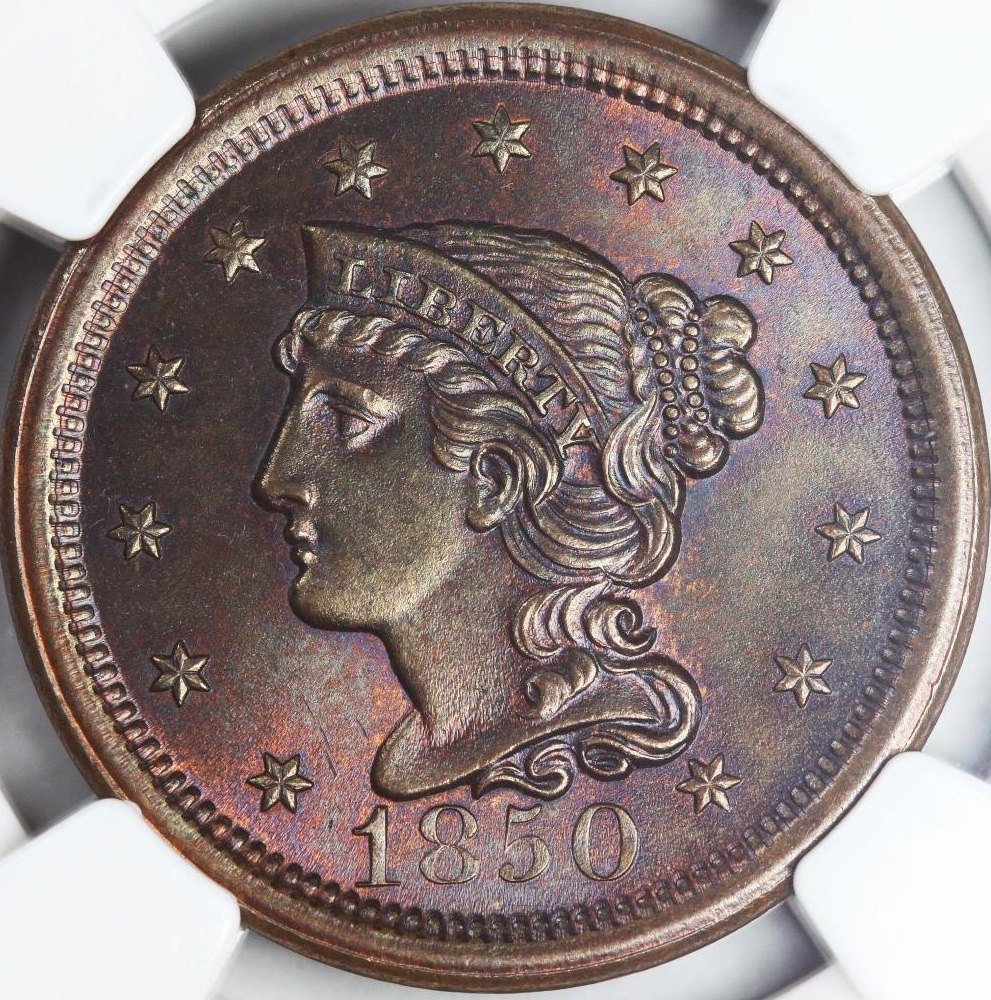
Braided Hair large cent, 1850

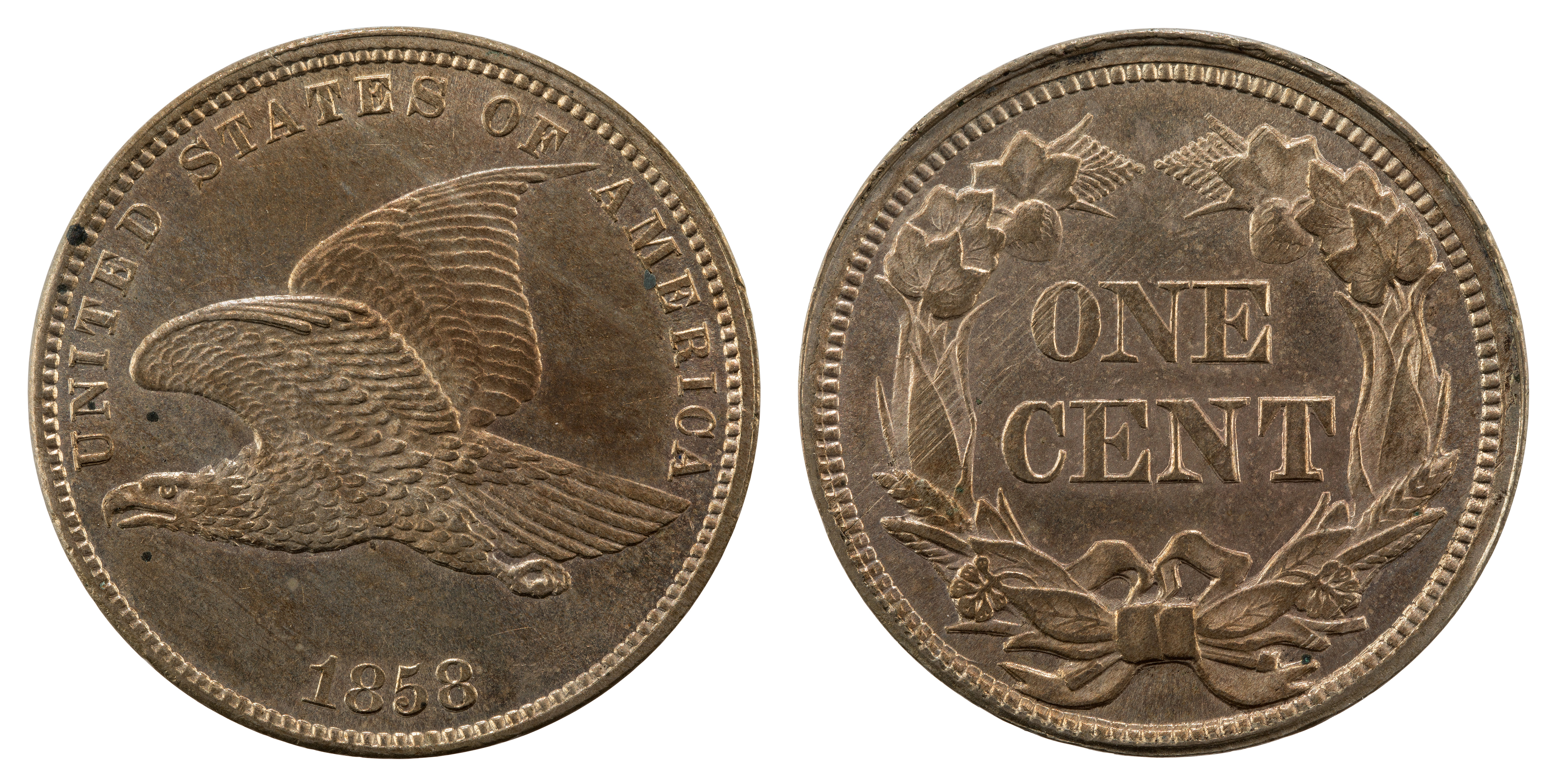
Flying Eagle small cent, 1858

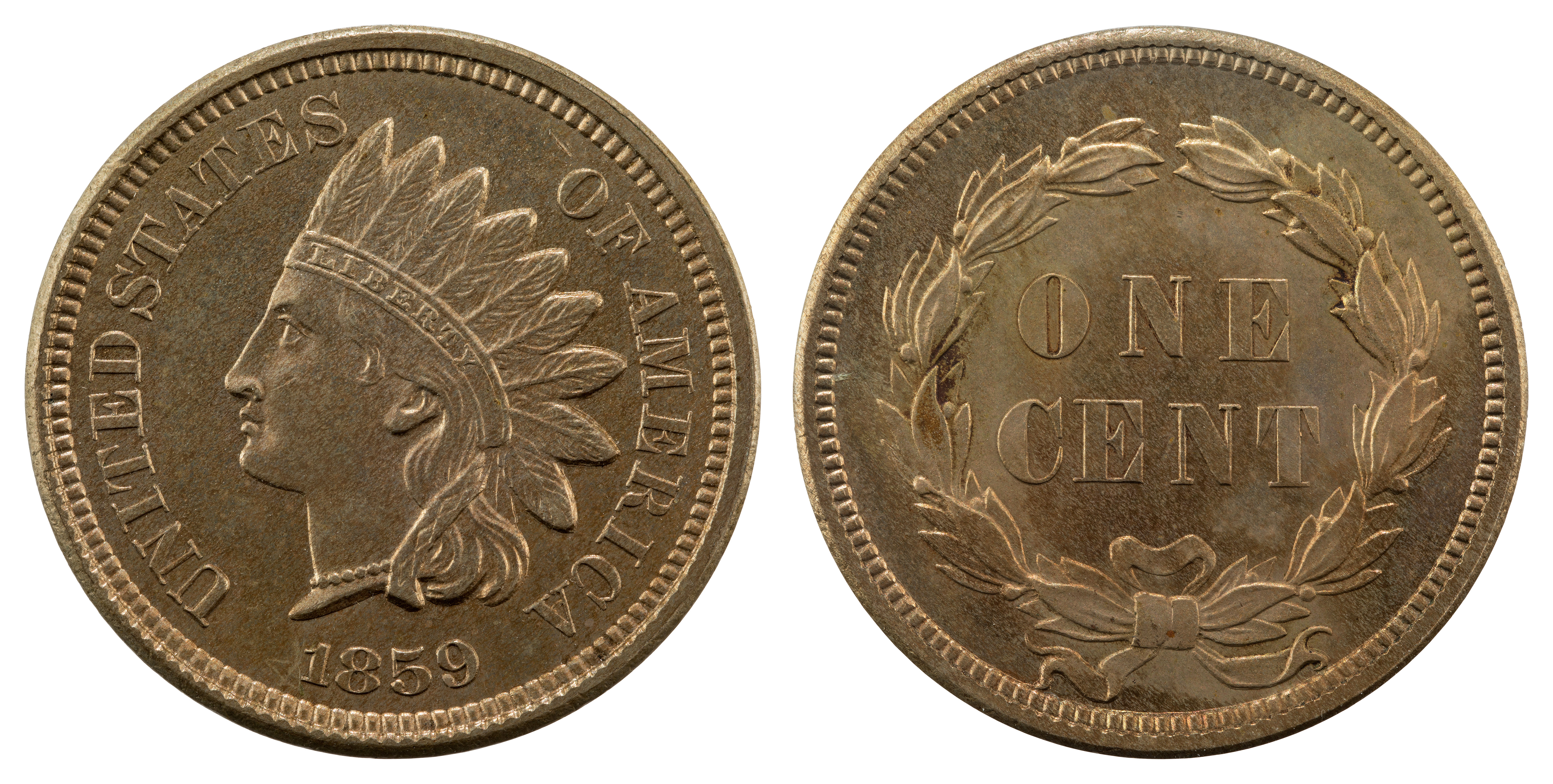
Indian Head cent, 1859

== Lincoln cent ==
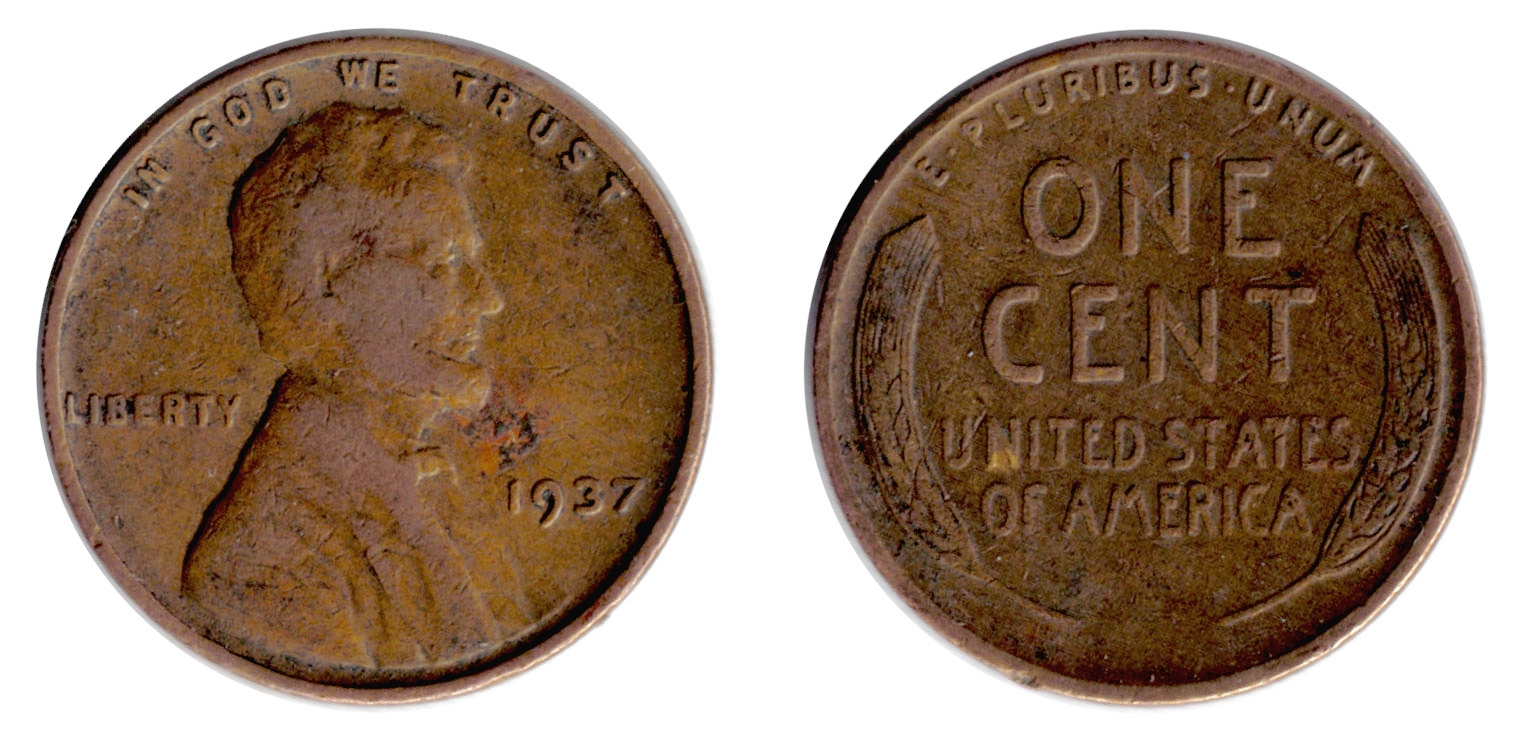
A 1937 wheat cent

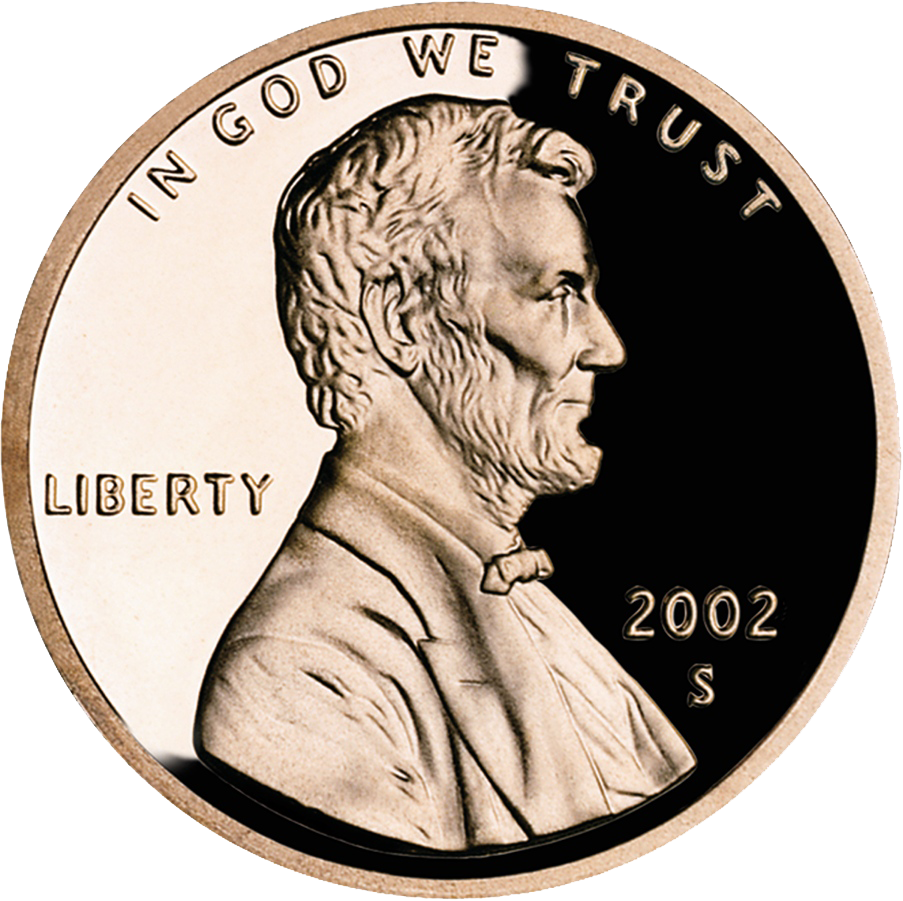
Cameo proof Lincoln cent, obverse

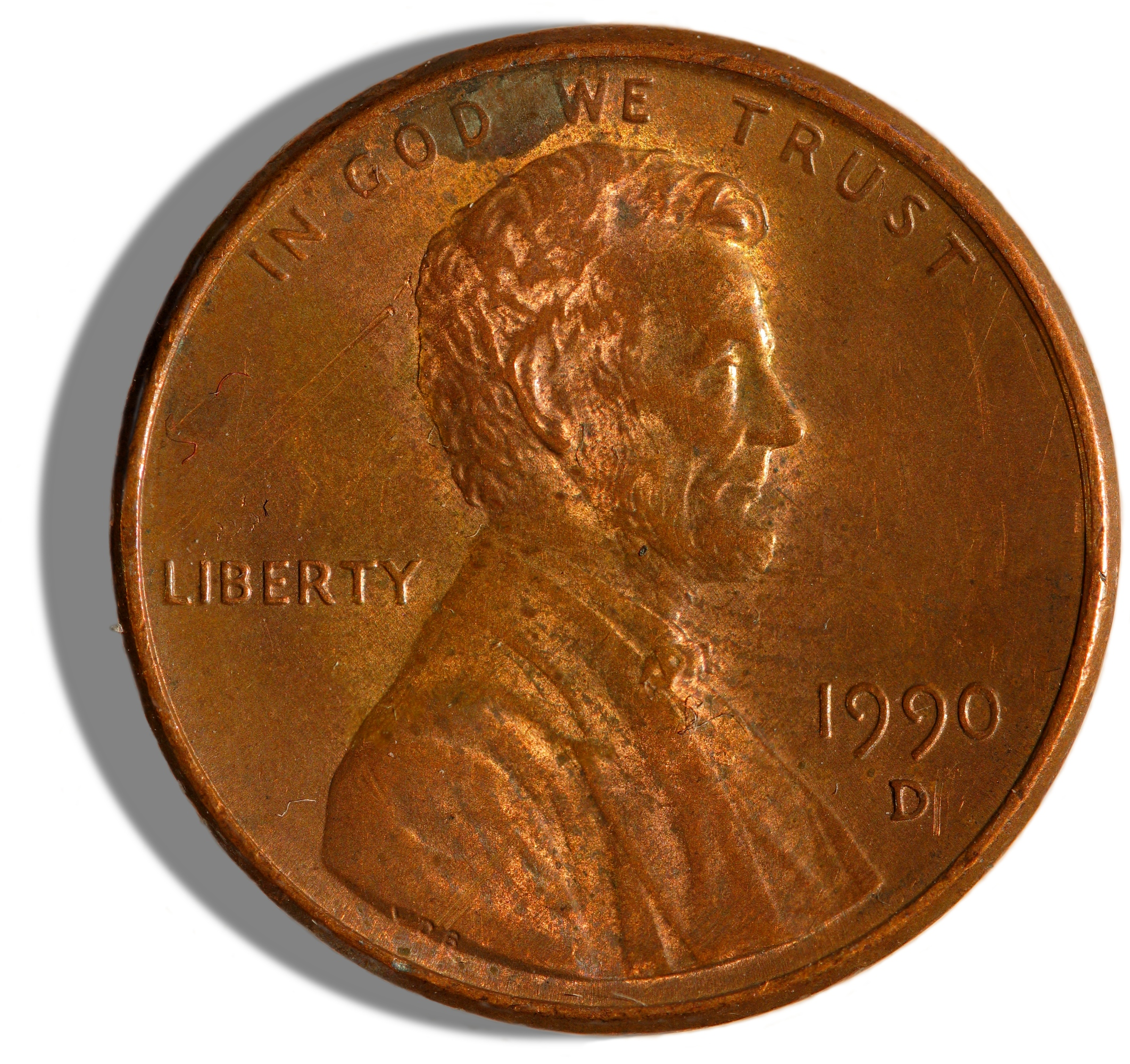
Obverse side of a cent after 17 years of circulation

The Lincoln cent is the current one-cent coin of the U.S. It was adopted in 1909 (which would have been Lincoln's 100th birthday), replacing the Indian Head cent. Its reverse was changed in 1959 from a wheat-stalks design to a design which includes the Lincoln Memorial (to commemorate Lincoln's sesquicentennial) and was replaced again in 2009 with four new designs to commemorate Lincoln's bicentennial. Until the discontinuation of penny production for circulation in 2025, there were more one-cent coins produced than any other denomination. Numismatic Lincoln cents continue to be produced in limited quantities. In its lifespan, the Lincoln cents has weathered both world wars, one of which temporarily changed its composition as part of the war effort. The obverse design is the longest produced for any circulating American coin.

=== History ===
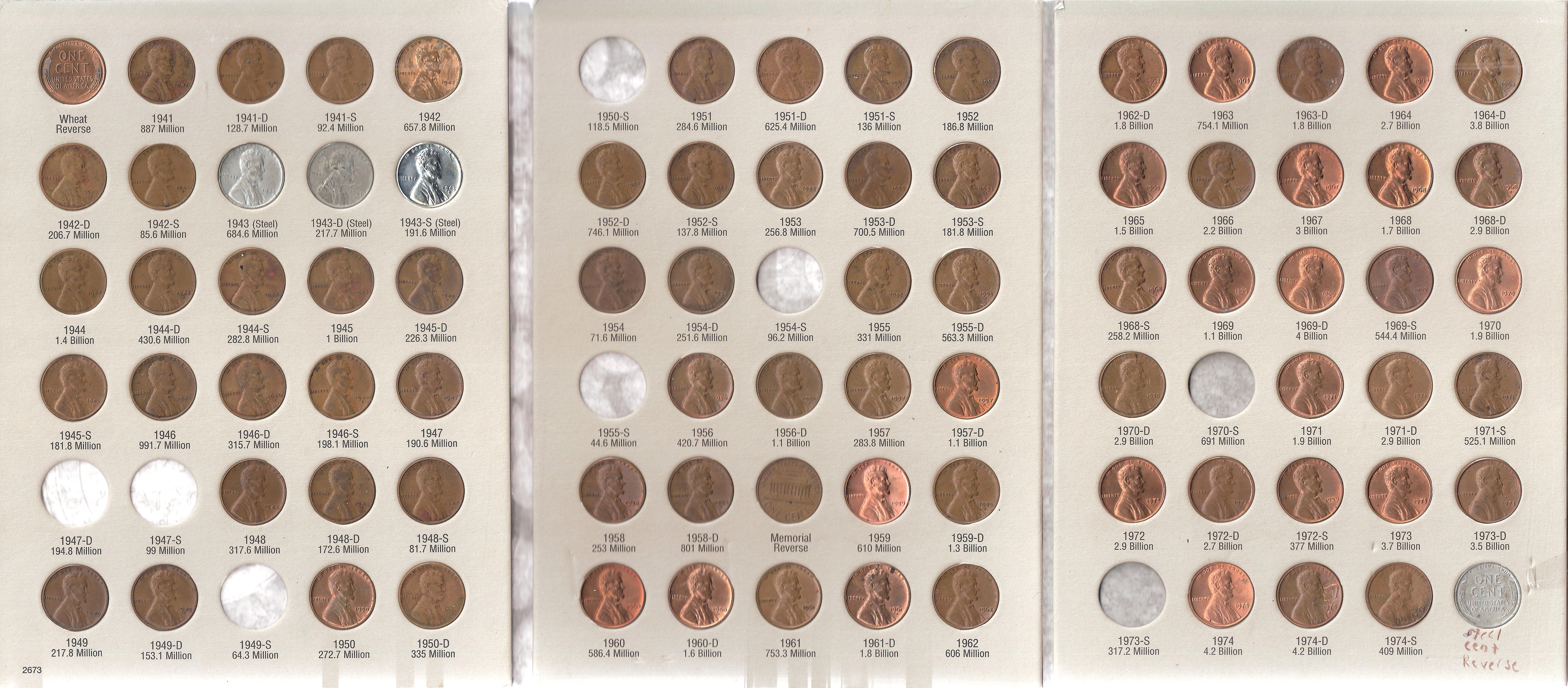
A nearly complete collection of Lincoln cents from 1941 to 1974 in a folder.

Reverses of the Lincoln cent

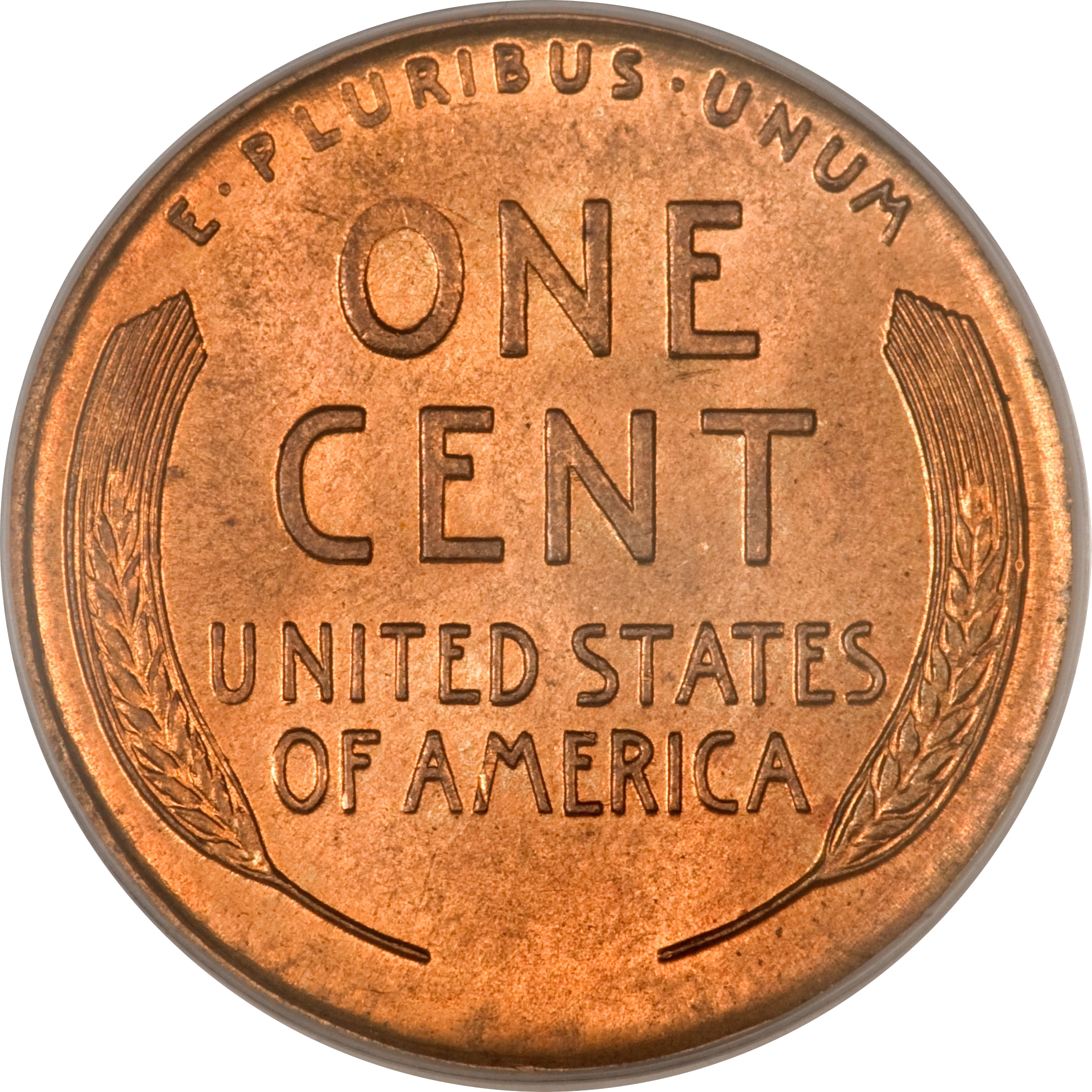
Wheat (1909–1958)

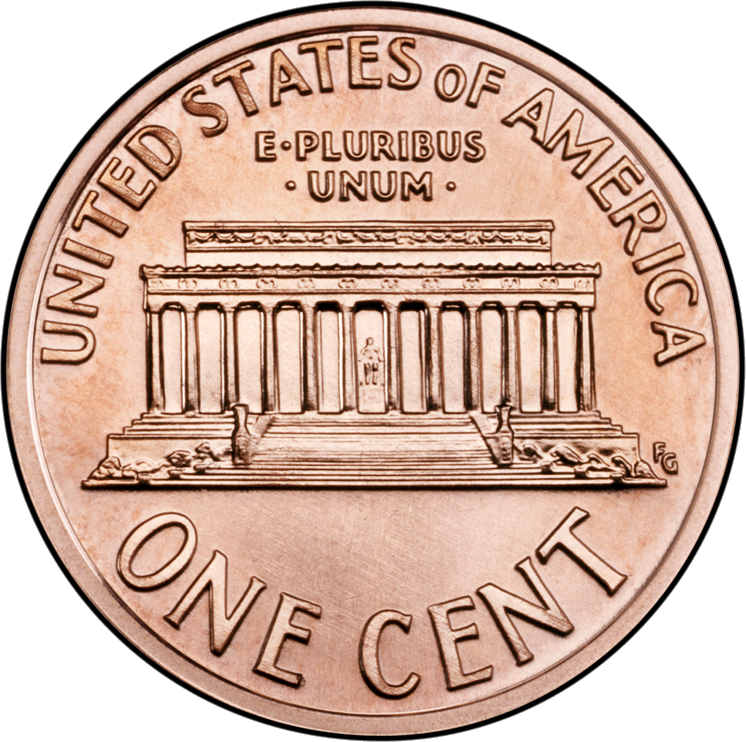
Lincoln Memorial (1959–2008)

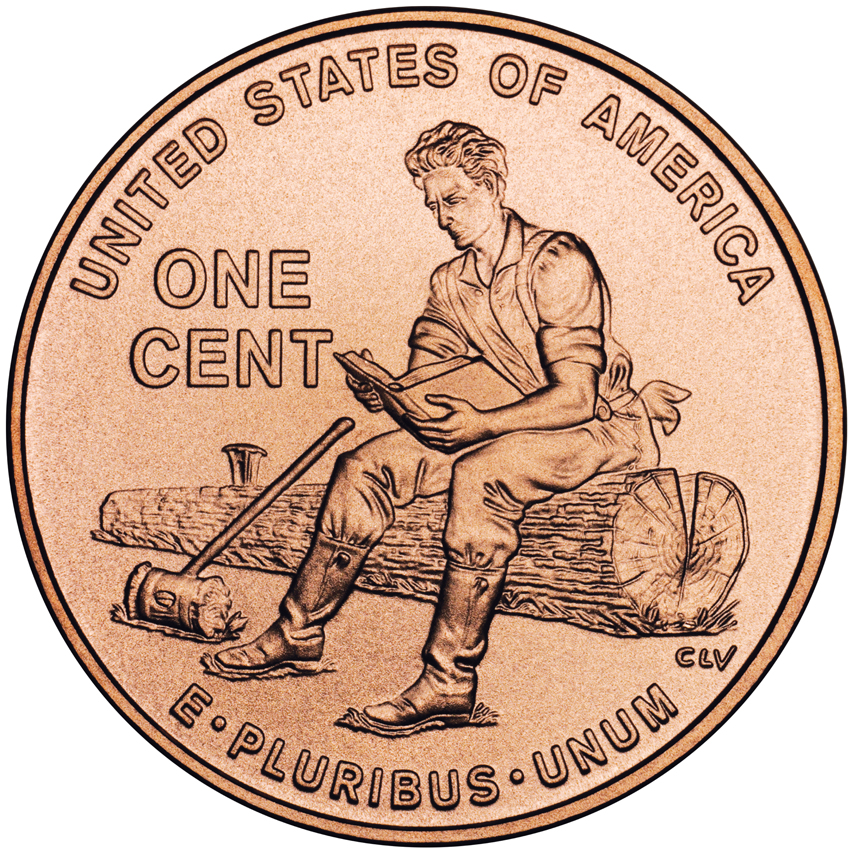
Formative Years in Indiana (Lincoln Bicentennial, 2009)

When the Lincoln one-cent coin made its initial appearance in 1909, it marked a radical departure from the accepted styling of United States coinage, as it was the first regular coin to bear a portrait other than the mythical Liberty which appeared on most pre-1909 regular coins. Previously, a strong feeling had prevailed against using portraits on coins in the United States, but public sentiment stemming from the 100th anniversary celebration of Abraham Lincoln's birth proved stronger than the long-standing tradition.

A variety of privately minted tokens bearing Lincoln's image circulated as one-cent pieces during Lincoln's presidency; legitimate coinage had become scarce during the Civil War. These early tokens undoubtedly influenced the denomination, appearance, size, and composition of Lincoln cents.

Theodore Roosevelt, the 26th U.S. president, thought American coins were so common and uninspiring that he attempted to get the motto "In God We Trust" removed as offending religion. Roosevelt had the opportunity to pose for a young Lithuanian-born Jew, Victor David Brenner, who, since arriving nineteen years earlier in the United States had become one of the nation's premier medalists. Roosevelt had learned of Brenner's talents in a settlement house on New York City's Lower East Side and was immediately impressed with a bas-relief that Brenner had made of Lincoln, based on a Mathew Brady photograph.

Roosevelt, who considered Lincoln the savior of the Union and the greatest Republican president, and who also considered himself Lincoln's political heir, ordered the new Lincoln cent to be based on Brenner's work and to be released just in time to commemorate Lincoln's 100th birthday in 1909. The likeness of President Lincoln on the obverse of the coin is an adaptation of a plaque Brenner created several years earlier which had come to the attention of President Roosevelt in New York.

In addition to the prescribed elements on U.S. coins—LIBERTY and the date—the motto In God We Trust appeared for the first time on a coin of this denomination. The United States Congress passed the Act of March 3, 1865, authorizing the use of this motto on U.S. coins, during Lincoln's tenure in office.

Even though no legislation was required for the new design, approval of the Secretary of the Treasury was necessary to make the change. Franklin MacVeagh gave his approval on July 14, 1909. On August 2, the new coin was released to the public.

=== Wheat cent (1909–1958) ===
A study of three potential reverses resulted in the approval of a very simple design bearing two wheatheads in memorial style. Between these, in the center of the coin, are the denomination and UNITED STATES OF AMERICA, while curving around the upper border is the national motto, E Pluribus Unum, Latin for "Out of Many, One".

The original model bore Brenner's name on the reverse, curving along the rim below UNITED STATES OF AMERICA. Before the coins were issued, however, the initials "VDB" were substituted because officials at the United States Mint felt the name was too prominent. After the coin was released, many protested that even the initials were conspicuous and detracted from the design. Because the coin was in great demand, and because to make a change would have required halting production, the decision was made to eliminate the initials entirely. In 1918, after the controversy over Brenner's name and initials on the reverse had died down, his initials were placed on the obverse with no further controversy. They are to be found in minute form on the rim of the bust, just under the shoulder of Lincoln.

Thus, in 1909, the U.S. had six different cents: the 1909 and 1909-S Indian Head cents, and four Lincoln coins: 1909 VDB, 1909-S VDB, 1909 and 1909-S. In all cases, the Philadelphia mintages far exceeded the San Francisco issues. While the smallest mintage is the '09-S Indian, the '09-S VDB is the key Lincoln date, and hence is most valuable. Its mintage of 484,000 is only 1.7% of the plain V.D.B.

=== Lincoln Memorial cent (1959–2008) ===
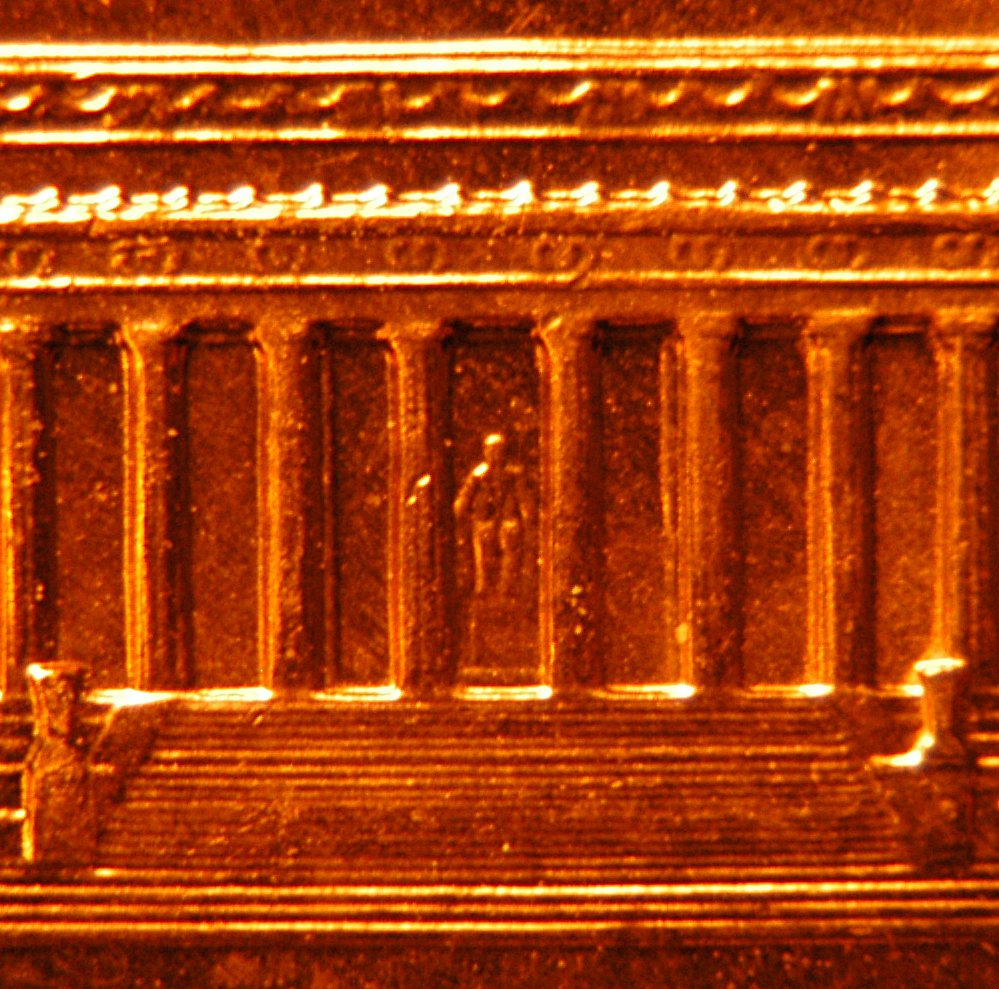
Detail of reverse showing Daniel Chester French's Abraham Lincoln statue inside the Lincoln Memorial

On February 12, 1959, a revised reverse design was introduced as part of the 150th anniversary of Lincoln's birth. No formal competition was held. Frank Gasparro, then Assistant Engraver at the Philadelphia Mint, prepared the winning entry, selected from a group of 23 models that the engraving staff at the mint had been asked to present for consideration. Again, only the approval of the Secretary of the Treasury was necessary to make the change because the design had been in use for more than the required 25 years.

The imposing marble Lincoln Memorial provides the central motif, with the legends E Pluribus Unum and UNITED STATES OF AMERICA completing the design, together with the denomination. The initials "FG" appear on the right, near the shrubbery. This series is noteworthy for having the image of Abraham Lincoln both on the obverse and reverse, as his likeness can be discerned in the depiction of Daniel Chester French's Abraham Lincoln statue at the center of the Lincoln Memorial on the reverse.

=== Lincoln Bicentennial cents (2009) ===
The Presidential $1 Coin Act of 2005 required that the cent's reverse be redesigned in 2009. This resulted in the mintage of four different coins showing scenes from Abraham Lincoln's life in honor of the bicentennial of his birth.

These four designs, unveiled September 22, 2008, at a ceremony held at the Lincoln Memorial on the National Mall in Washington, D.C., are:

- Birth and early childhood in Kentucky: this design features a log cabin and Lincoln's birth year 1809. It was designed by Richard Alan Masters and sculpted by Jim Licaretz. This cent was released into circulation on Lincoln's 200th birthday, February 12, 2009, at a special ceremony at LaRue County High School in Hodgenville, Kentucky, Lincoln's birthplace. The mintage was extremely low compared to prior years, see Lincoln cent mintage figures. It has been nicknamed the "Log Cabin Penny".
- Formative years in Indiana: this design features a young Lincoln reading while taking a break from rail splitting. It was designed and sculpted by Charles Vickers. Nicknamed the "Indiana Penny", it was released on May 14, 2009.
- Professional life in Illinois: this design features a young professional Lincoln standing before the Illinois State Capitol, in Springfield. It was designed by Joel Iskowitz and sculpted by Don Everhart. Nicknamed the "Illinois Penny", it was released on August 13, 2009.
- Presidency in Washington, D.C.: this design features the half-completed Capitol dome. It was designed by Susan Gamble and sculpted by Joseph Menna. This fourth cent was released to the public on November 12, 2009. U.S. Mint released collector's sets containing this design in copper prior to the public launch of this design in zinc.

Special 2009 cents struck for sale in sets to collectors had the metallic copper content of cents minted in 1909 (95% copper, 5% tin and zinc). Those struck for circulation retained the normal composition of a zinc core coated with copper.

=== Union Shield cent (2010–present) ===
The 2005 act that authorized the redesign for the Bicentennial stated that another redesigned reverse for the Lincoln cent will be minted which "shall bear an image emblematic of President Lincoln's preservation of the United States of America as a single and united country". Eighteen designs were proposed for the reverse of the 2010 cent. In April 2009, the Commission of Fine Arts (CFA) met and selected a design that showed 13 wheat sheaves bound together with a ring symbolizing American unity as one nation.

Later this design was withdrawn because it was similar to coinage issued in Germany in the 1920s. The Citizens Coinage Advisory Committee later met and chose a design showing a Union shield with ONE CENT superimposed in a scroll. E Pluribus Unum was also depicted in the upper portion of the shield. In June 2009 the CFA met again and chose a design featuring a modern rendition of the American flag. As a part of the release ceremony for the last of the 2009 cents on November 12, the design for the 2010 cent was announced.

The design chosen was the one that was chosen earlier by the CCAC. The 13 stripes on the shield "represent the states joined in one compact union to support the Federal government, represented by the horizontal bar above". The mint also noted that a shield was commonly used in paintings in the Capitol hallways painted by Constantino Brumidi, an artist in the Capitol active during the Lincoln Presidency.

The obverse of the cent was also changed to a modern rendition of Brenner's design. The new Union Shield design replaces the Lincoln Memorial in use since 1959. The coin was designed by artist Lyndall Bass and sculpted by U.S. Mint sculptor-engraver Joseph Menna. In January 2010, the coins were released early in Puerto Rico; this was caused by a shortage of 2009-dated pennies on the island. The new design was released at a ceremony at the Abraham Lincoln Presidential Library in Springfield, Illinois on February 11, 2010.

In 2017, cents minted in Philadelphia were struck with a "P" mintmark to celebrate the 225th anniversary of the U.S. Mint. 2017 is the only year that Philadelphia cents have had a mintmark. In 2019, the West Point Mint minted pennies marked with a "W" mintmark for the first time, which were only available with their annual sets, wrapped separately in their own plastic wrap. An uncirculated cent was included with the uncirculated mint set, a proof cent with the proof set, and a reverse proof with the silver proof set.

Following the 2025 halt to circulating penny production, the mint and Stack's Bowers Galleries conducted a joint auction of 232 sets of commemorative "Omega Pennies". The three-coin sets featured traditional zinc cents struck at both the Philadelphia and Denver Mints with an "Ω" privy mark, as well as a 24-karat gold cent struck at Philadelphia, the first time the coin has been produced in gold. The sets sold for $50,000–80,000 each, with the set of the final coins struck and their dies sold for $800,000.

The Circulating Collectible Coin Redesign Act of 2020 (Pub. L. 116–330 (text) (PDF)) provides for, among other things, special one-year designs for circulating coinage in 2026, including the cent, for the United States Semiquincentennial (250th anniversary). In 2024, the Citizens Coinage Advisory Committee and the Commission of Fine Arts recommended that the penny receive a simple dual-dating of "1776~2026" without further modifications to the reverse. In December 2025, the mint announced it would produce commemorative collectable cents with this design in 2026.

== Manufacturing costs ==
The price of metal drives the cost to manufacture a cent. The Secretary of the Treasury has authority to alter the percentage of copper and zinc in the one-cent coin if needed due to cost fluctuations. Since 2006, the mint's costs for cents have exceeded the face value of the coin. The mint's fixed costs and overhead, are absorbed by other circulating coins. As a result, the U.S. Treasury lost tens of millions of dollars every year producing cents. For example, the loss in 2013 was $55 million, increasing to a reported $85.3 million in losses on the nearly 3.2 billion pennies produced through the 2024 fiscal year. The cost to mint a cent in 2024 was 3.69 cents.

Cost to manufacture and distribute a penny, in cents
Fiscal year	2010	2011	2012	2013	2014	2015	2016	2017	2018	2019	2022	2024
Cost (cents)	1.79	2.41	2.00	1.83	1.70	1.67	1.50	1.82	2.06	1.99	2.72	3.00

When copper reached a record high in February 2011, the melt value of a 95% copper cent was more than three times its face value. In January 2014, a pre-1982 cent contained 2.203 cents' worth of copper and zinc, making it an attractive target for melting by people wanting to sell the metals for profit. In comparison, post-1982 copper-plated zinc cents have a metallurgical value of only 0.552 cents. Prior to 1982, the fluctuating price of copper periodically caused penny shortages, as people hoarded them for their perceived metallic value.

Most modern vending machines do not accept pennies, further diminishing their utility.

In 2006, in anticipation of people melting down U.S. pennies and U.S. nickels for profit, the U.S. Mint implemented regulations that criminalize the melting of pennies and nickels and place limits on export of the coins. Violators can be punished with a fine of up to $10,000 USD, imprisoned for a maximum of five years, or both.

== Debate over elimination ==
In 2024, about a quarter trillion pennies were estimated to be in circulation, or more than 700 pennies for each person in the United States. The Treasury said the coins are "severely underutilized"; they are rarely returned from consumers to businesses. Most Americans do not actually spend pennies, but rather only receive them in change and proceed to store them at home, or perhaps return them to a bank for higher denomination currencies, or cash them in at coin counting kiosks.

Because most pennies are used so few times before being lost or stored – data from 1995 found that two-thirds of pennies make "a one-way trip from the mint... to the consumers" – they must be continuously replaced with newly minted coins to a greater degree than other denominations. A 1996 General Accounting Office report found that many Americans consider it a "nuisance coin". Public opinion polling in November 2025 found that 47% of Americans favored ending penny production, with 27% opposed; more opposed removing them from circulation, 42% to 34%.

=== Legislative attempts ===
United States Representative Jim Kolbe (R-AZ) introduced the Price Rounding Act of 1989 to withdraw the penny from circulation by forcing all cash transactions to be rounded to the nearest nickel. He later introduced bills in 2001 (the Legal Tender Modernization Act) and 2006 (the Currency Overhaul for an Industrious Nation [COIN] Act) that would also have stopped penny production. In 2017, Senators John McCain (R-AZ) and Mike Enzi (R-WY) introduced the Currency Optimization, Innovation, and National Savings (COINS) Act of 2017, which would have stopped the minting of the penny for general circulation for 10 years.

In April 2025, Representatives Lisa McClain (R-MI) and Robert Garcia (D-CA) introduced the Common Cents Act, a bill to formalize an end to penny production for general circulation and require all cash transactions to be rounded to the nearest nickel. According to the bill's text, the mint would be permitted to continue producing uncirculated pennies for collectors. The Common Cents Act, amended to permit cash rounding when pennies are unavailable rather than require it, would clear both chambers of Congress on September 28, 2026 and come into effect in September 2027. The Common Cents Act as passed does not eliminate the penny; it encourages exact change to be provided if available.

=== 2025 production halt ===
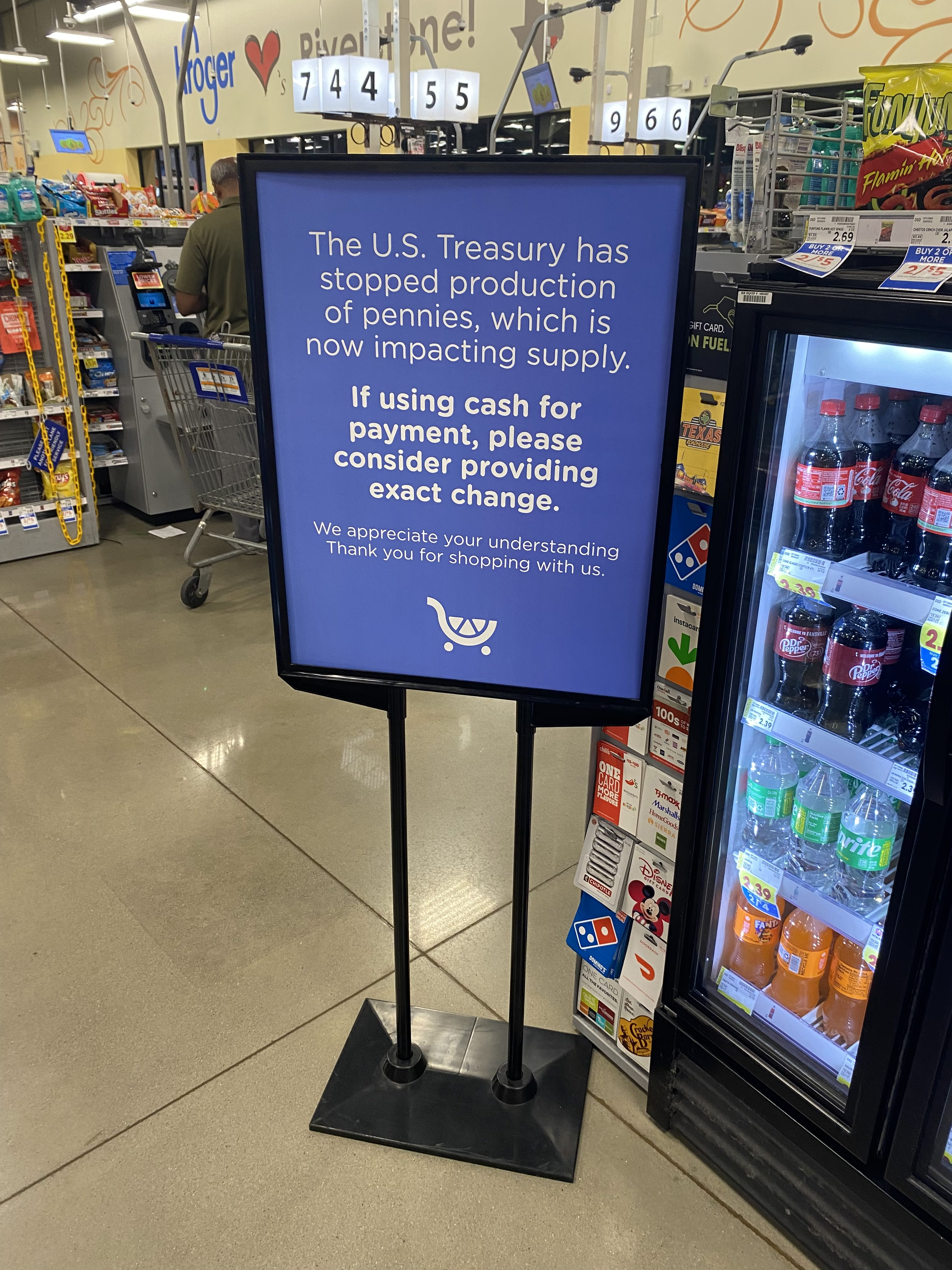
A Kroger in Sugar Land, Texas, telling customers to provide exact change in the wake of the end of circulating penny production, November 2025.

In February 2025, President Donald Trump instructed Secretary of the Treasury Scott Bessent to halt penny production, citing high production costs. An act of Congress is necessary for the penny's elimination, and no bill to eliminate or cease production of the penny has yet passed. However, the treasury secretary has authority to suspend coin production upon determining that new ones are no longer needed.

In May 2025, the U.S. Treasury announced that the mint had stopped purchasing penny planchets and production would cease at the exhaustion of the existing blanks. The last penny produced for general circulation was minted at the U.S. Mint in Philadelphia on November 12, 2025. (Note: It was not circulated; instead, it was sold at auction in a set of three pennies, which sold for $800,000 (all of the 696 pennies sold for $16.7 million in total).) The mint stated it will continue to produce pennies for collector sets and commemorative purposes. These numismatic versions are still legal tender. The Federal Reserve stated it would continue to recirculate pennies for "as long as possible".

By late 2025, the Federal Reserve had stopped accepting and distributing pennies at most of its terminals. These closures led to regional penny shortages. Some affected businesses began rounding cash transactions to the nearest nickel when pennies are unavailable. Some states and cities require exact change to be given, and there was no nationwide policy on rounding cash transactions at the time. Amid potential confusion, some states provided recommendations for rounding or considered legislation. As of July 2026, 20 states have enacted legislation permitting businesses to round cash transactions when pennies are unavailable; Arizona is the only state with mandatory cash rounding when pennies are unavailable.

Without a clear mechanism for withdrawal or continued processing of pennies, The Atlantic declared that "Pennies Are Trash Now". Bipartisan lawmakers and the American Bankers Association pressured the Federal Reserve to resume penny deposits to ease the shortages, and it did so in January 2026. The Federal Reserve resumed penny ordering in March 2026. Still, with no new pennies entering circulation, penny circulation is expected to gradually decrease over time.

== Toxicity ==
Zinc is a major component of U.S. pennies minted after mid-1982, and is toxic in large quantities. Swallowing such a coin, which is 97.5% zinc, can cause damage to the stomach lining because of the high solubility of zinc in the acidic environment of the stomach. Coins are the most commonly ingested foreign body in children, but are generally allowed to pass spontaneously, unless the patient is symptomatic. Zinc toxicity is mostly in the form of the ingestion of U.S. pennies minted after 1982, and is commonly fatal in dogs, where it causes a severe hemolytic anemia.

== See also ==
- 1909-S VDB Lincoln Cent
- 1943 steel cent
- 1943 copper cent
- 1955 doubled-die cent
- 1974 aluminum cent
- Large cent (United States coin)
- Mill (currency)
- Penny (Canadian coin)
- Penny debate in the United States
- Ring cent
- Take a penny, leave a penny
- United States Mint coin production
- Lincoln cent mintage figures
