= Continental Currency dollar coin =

Early United States coin

- United States
- Value: 1 Continental dollar (not specified on coin)
- Mass: 15–19 g
- Diameter: ≈38 mm
- Thickness: 6 mm
- Composition: Pewter, brass, or silver
- Years of minting: 1776

Obverse
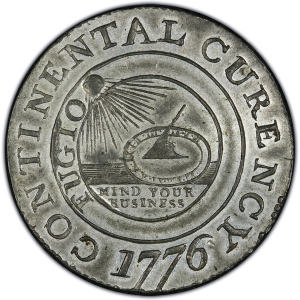
- Design: "Mind Your Business", Sun, and sundial, surrounded by "Continental Currency" (misspelled on some varieties) and date
- Designer: Benjamin Franklin
- Design date: 1776

Reverse
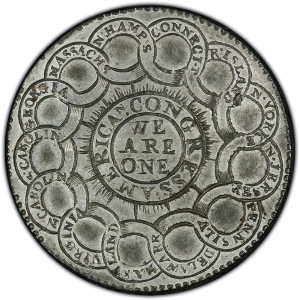
- Design: "We Are One" surrounded by "American Congress" and 13 state chain links
- Designer: Benjamin Franklin
- Design date: 1776

The Continental Currency dollar coin (also known as Continental dollar coin, Fugio dollar, or Franklin dollar) was the first pattern coin struck for the United States. The coins, which were designed by Benjamin Franklin, were minted in 1776 and examples were made on pewter, brass, and silver planchets.

== History ==
The United States started issuing its own banknotes in 1776, denominated in Continental Currency, after the start of the American Revolutionary War and the signing of the United States Declaration of Independence. While no legislation authorizing a dollar coin has been discovered, no resolutions from July 22, 1776, through September 26, 1778 mentioned the one-dollar banknote, suggesting that it was to have been replaced by a coin.

Benjamin Franklin designed both sides of the coin. The obverse features the Sun shining sunlight on a sundial, the Latin motto "Fugio" (I flee/fly), and "Mind your business", a rebus meaning "time flies, so mind your business". The reverse features 13 chain links representing a plea for the Thirteen Colonies to remain united.

=== Controversy over coin status ===
An article in the January 2018 issue of The Numismatist argued that the Continental Currency dollar was merely a token produced in Great Britain as a souvenir. The article cited the fact that there is no contemporary record of the pieces having been commissioned by the Continental Congress or anywhere in the colonies until long after the revolution.

== Production ==
Elisha Gallaudet engraved the coin dies, according to numismatist Eric P. Newman. An estimated 6,000 coins were minted, probably in New York.

Today, about a hundred dollars survive, struck in pewter. Historians surmise that much of the original mintage was melted due to wartime demand for the alloy. Only a few silver examples are known to exist. This composition was most likely standard for circulation. However, the idea of a silver dollar might have been scrapped, as the United States had no reliable supply of silver during the war. Several brass trial strikings are also known.

== Varieties ==
As with other early United States coinage, the dies for the Continental dollar coin were hand-punched, meaning no two dies were the same. One of the known obverse varieties was accidentally made with "CURRENCY" misspelled "CURENCY".

Another variety, known as the "Ornamented Date", was also made with a misspelled "CURRENCY", this time as "CURRENCEY". The blundered die was corrected by punching a "Y" over the "E" and an ornamental figure was engraved over the original "Y".

== Later use of the design ==
The 1787 Fugio cent, the first officially circulated coin of the United States, incorporated many elements of the design of the Continental Currency coin.

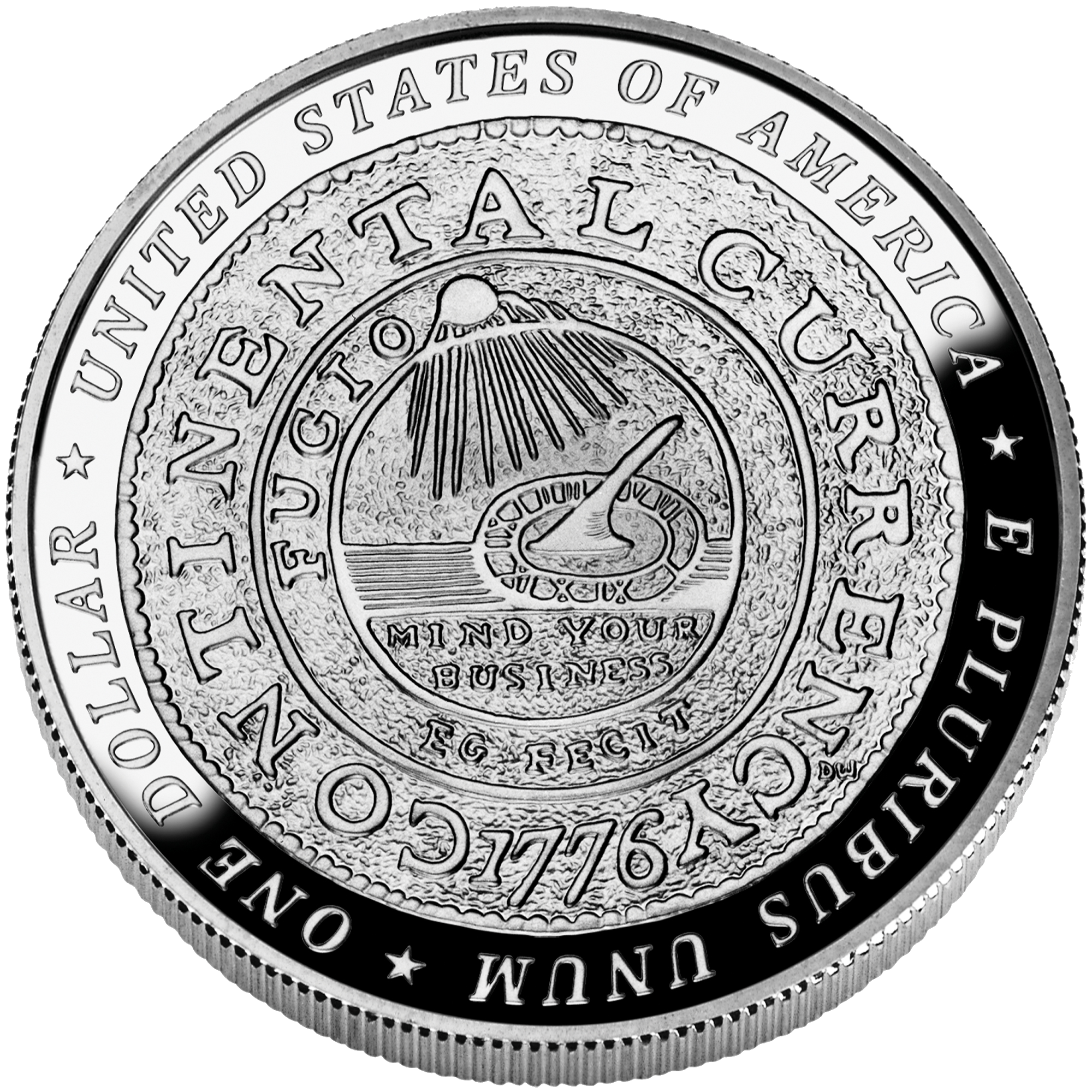
Reverse of the 2006 "Founding Father" Benjamin Franklin silver dollar

An adaption of the Continental Currency dollar coin appears on the reverse of the "Founding Father" variety of the 2006 Benjamin Franklin silver dollar.

== See also ==
- Dollar coin (United States)
- Nova Constellatio
