= Fugio cent =

First official circulation coin of the United States

One cent
- United States
- Value: 0.01 U.S. dollar
- Mass: 10.2 g
- Composition: Copper

Obverse
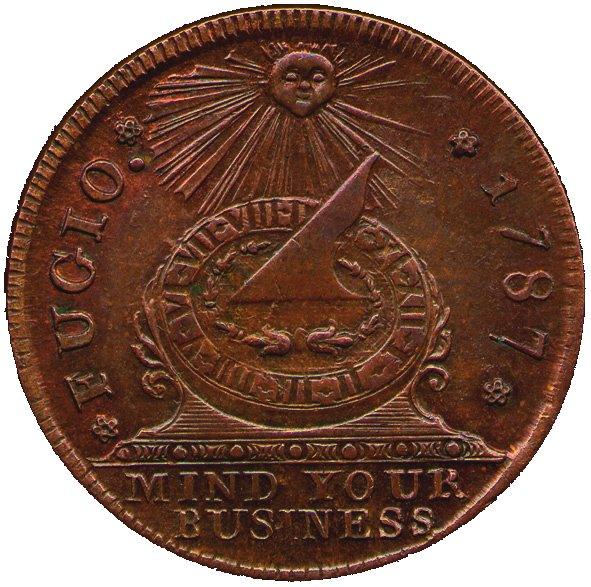
- "New Haven Restrike", probably produced at the Scovill Mint in Waterbury, Connecticut
- Design: "Mind Your Business", Sun, and sundial
- Designer: Unknown, reputedly Benjamin Franklin
- Design date: 1787

Reverse
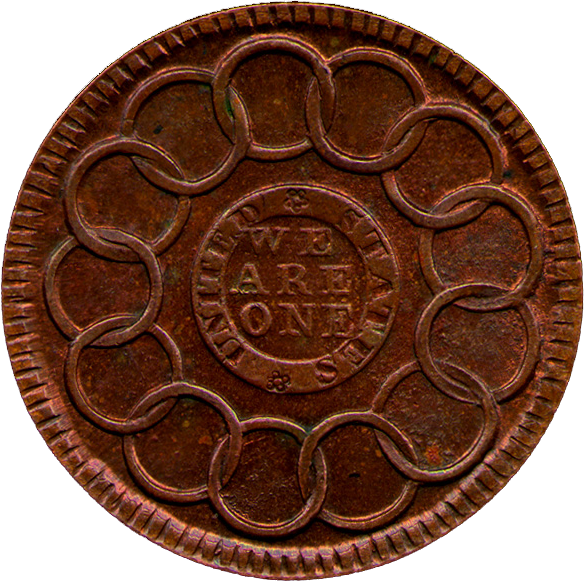
- Design: "We Are One" surrounded by the words "United States" and 13 state chain links
- Designer: Unknown, reputedly Benjamin Franklin
- Design date: 1787

The Fugio cent, also known as the Franklin cent, is the first official circulation coin of the United States. Consisting of 0.36 oz (10 g) of copper and minted dated 1787, by some accounts it was designed by Benjamin Franklin. Its design is very similar to Franklin's 1776 Continental Currency dollar coin that was produced in pattern pieces as potential Continental currency but was never circulated.

== History ==
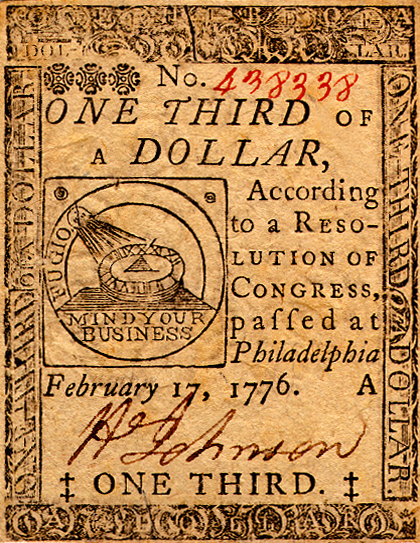
Continental currency 1/3-dollar note (obverse), with the inscriptions "Fugio" and "Mind your business".

On April 21, 1787, the Congress of the Confederation of the United States authorized a design for an official copper penny, later referred to as the Fugio cent because of its image of the Sun and its light shining down on a sundial with the caption, "Fugio" (Latin: I flee/fly, referring to time flying by). By some accounts, this coin was designed by Benjamin Franklin; as a reminder to its holders, he put at its bottom the message, "Mind your business". This design was based on the 1776 "Continental dollar" coin, which was produced in pattern pieces but was never circulated.

The reverse side of both the 1776 Continental dollar coins and paper notes, and the 1787 coins, bore the third motto "We Are One" (in English) surrounded by thirteen chain links, representing the original thirteen colonial states. Following the reform of the central government with the 1788 ratification of the 1787 Constitution, gold and silver coins transitioned to the motto "E pluribus unum" from the Great Seal of the United States.

=== The Bank of New York Hoard ===
In 1788, the Bank of New York stored several thousand Fugio cents in a keg in its basement. In 1856, the coins were put into cotton bags and stored away again. The trove was rediscovered in 1926. The coins were then given out as souvenirs and keepsakes to clients until 1948 when the American Numismatic Society examined the remaining 1,641 coins. The cache became known as the Bank of New York Hoard. Several of the coins were donated to the Society, and others were sold to collectors. All of the coins found were in mint state condition, most with brown toning and some with water damage. The bank retained 819 of the coins.

== Collecting ==
The coin has been a long-time favorite of collectors, especially specialists in colonial American or early Federal coinage. In January 2022, the Fugio Cent was re-classified by major coin grading services as a "regular-issue United States coin".

== See also ==
- History of the United States dollar
- Large cent (United States coin) (1793–1857)
- Nova Constellatio (1783 pattern pieces)
- United States dollar

Preceded by None	United States one-cent coin (1787)	Succeeded by Chain cent
