= Wreath cent =

One-cent coin issued by the United States Mint in 1793

Flowing Hair large cent, wreath reverse
- United states
- Value: 0.01 U.S. Dollar
- Mass: 13.48 g
- Diameter: 26-27 mm
- Edge: Decorated with bars and vines
- Composition: 100% Cu
- Years of minting: 1793
- Mint marks: None, all large cents were minted at the Philadelphia Mint

Obverse
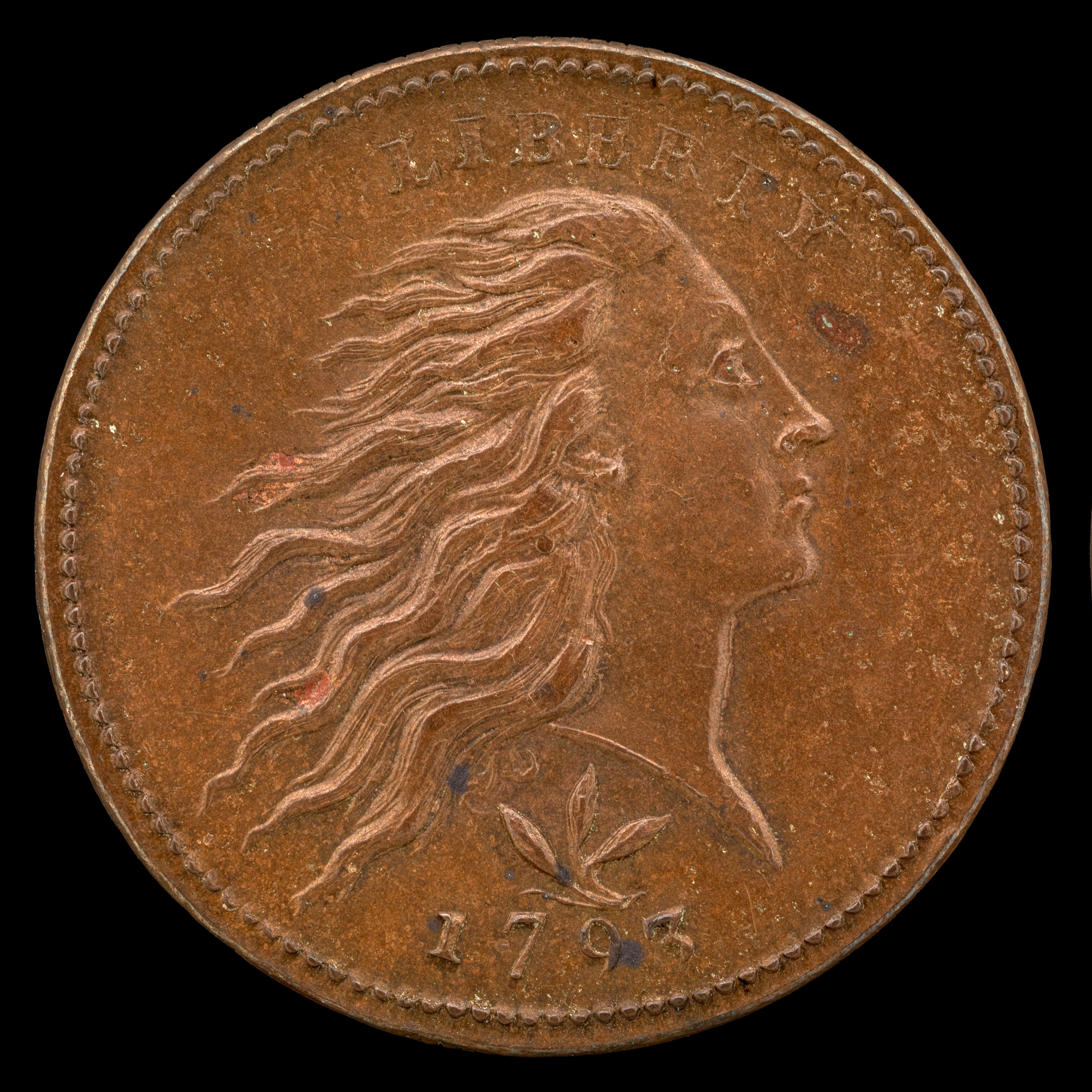
- Design: Liberty
- Designer: Henry Voigt
- Design date: 1793

Reverse
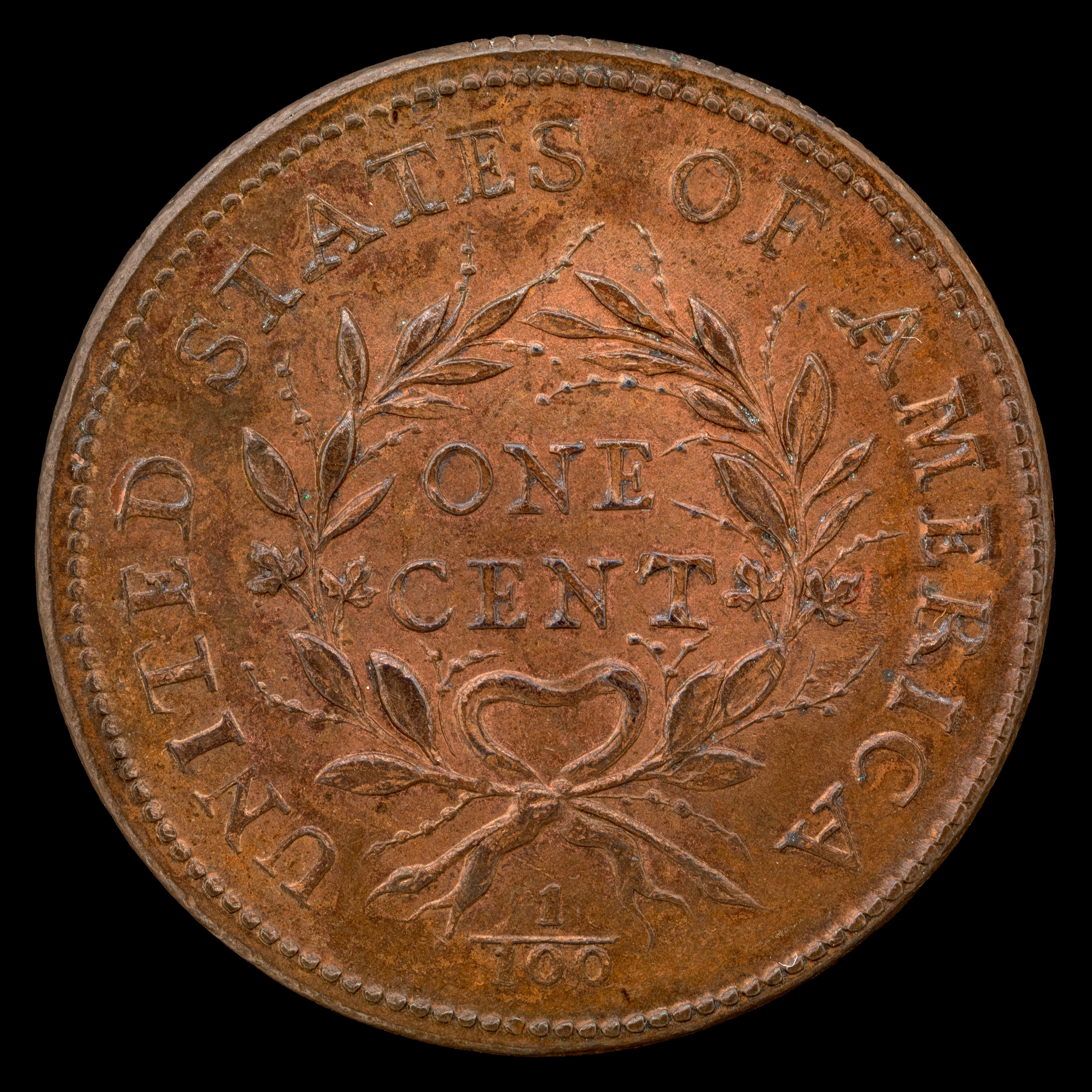
- Design: Wreath
- Designer: Henry Voigt
- Design date: 1793

The Wreath cent was an American large cent. It was the second design type, following the Chain cent in 1793. It was produced only during that year.

== Obverse design ==
The obverse design consisted of a stylized Liberty head with flowing hair. The inscription "LIBERTY" appeared above the portrait. Below it was a three-leaved sprig and the date. The design of the Liberty head was modified somewhat from that of the Chain cent to address public criticism.

== Reverse design ==
The reverse's central design figure, for which the coin is named, was a wreath. The words "ONE CENT" appeared within the wreath, and the corresponding fraction 1/100 appeared beneath it. Along the outer edge was inscribed "UNITED STATES OF AMERICA". A decorative beaded border was added along the rim.

== Varieties ==
Approximately 63,353 Wreath cents were struck. Early specimens featured a stylized "vine/bars" design on the edges of the planchet, which was identical to that of the earlier Chain cent. Later on, this was changed to a lettered edge reading ONE HUNDRED FOR A DOLLAR. Early American copper collectors generally categorize the coins still further into thirteen different varieties under the Sheldon system. Most of these variations entail relatively minor changes, and often require careful examination to discern. One variety, however, is far more recognizable: the "Strawberry Leaf". On these strikings, the trefoil sprig above the date took the form of a strawberry (Fragaria) plant. Only four such specimens are known, and all are heavily circulated. The finest known Strawberry Leaf cent sold at auction for $414,000 in November 2004.

== Collecting ==
As the second of three different large cent types struck in 1793, the Wreath cent is desired by both large cent collectors and type collectors alike, which is partially responsible for its continued high demand.

Preceded by Chain cent	United States one-cent coin (1793)	Succeeded by Liberty Cap cent
