= Benjamin Franklin silver dollar =

Commemorative coin

$1
- United States
- Years of minting: 2006

Obverse

Reverse

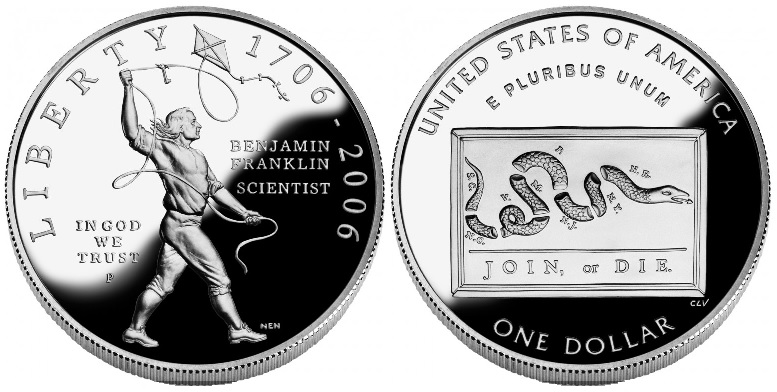
"Scientist"

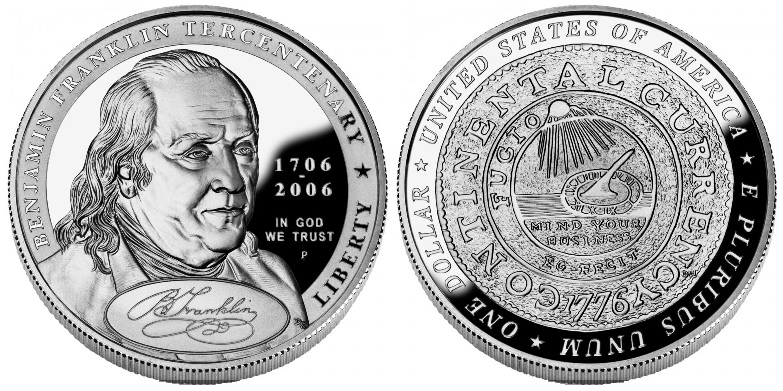
"Founding Father"

Two commemorative Benjamin Franklin silver dollar coins were issued by the United States Mint in 2006 in honor of the tercentenary of the birth of Benjamin Franklin.

One coin, issued in honor of his legacy as a Scientist, depicts a youthful Franklin with a kite and key on the obverse and his famous 1754 cartoon Join, or Die on the reverse. The obverse was designed by Norman E. Nemeth and the reverse was designed by Charles Vickers.

The other coin commemorates his contributions as a Founding Father. The obverse was designed by Don Everhart and depicts a portrait of a mature Franklin and includes his signature. The reverse was designed by Donna Weaver and depicts the 1776 Continental Currency dollar coin, which was originally designed by Franklin.

The coins are 90% silver and weigh 26.73 g with a diameter of 38.1 mm (thus containing 0.7735 Troy ounces of pure silver). Proof and uncirculated versions were produced at the Philadelphia Mint.

== See also ==
- List of United States commemorative coins and medals (2000s)
- United States commemorative coins
