= Bank of New York Hoard =

Hoard of thousands of Fugio Cents

- Material: Fugio Cents
- Size: Several thousand coins (Est.)
- Created: 1787
- Discovered: 1856 (First discovery at B.N.Y.); 1926 (Second discovery at B.N.Y.)
- Present location: Bank of New York (New York City)

The Bank of New York Hoard is the name given to identify a treasure trove of several thousand Fugio Cents that were discovered at the Bank of New York. Sometime in 1788, a keg of Fugio cents was acquired by the bank and stored in the basement. The coins were forgotten until they were rediscovered in 1856, this time at the bank's current location. At that time the coins were placed in cotton bags and put away until a final rediscovery of the coins was made in 1926. The coins were then given out as souvenirs and keepsakes to clients until 1948 when the American Numismatic Society examined the remaining 1,641 coins. Several of the coins were donated to the Society; others were sold to collectors. All of the coins found were in mint state condition, most with brown toning. The find was important to collectors who wished to obtain a mint state example of the coin.

The bank kept 819 of the remaining coins which range in grade from mint state to corroded due to past water damage while in storage. Despite the merger which led to the bank's closure in 2007, it was reported in 2013 that the coins still remain on the property. The bank has refused to distribute the remaining coins, and has kept them for historical value and appreciation.

== See also ==
- List of hoards in North America
