= Chain cent =

First circulating coin produced by the US Mint

Flowing Hair large cent, chain reverse
- United states
- Value: 0.01 U.S. Dollar
- Mass: 13.48 g
- Diameter: 26–27 mm
- Edge: Decorated with bars and vines
- Composition: 100% Cu
- Years of minting: 1793
- Mint marks: None, all large cents were minted at the Philadelphia Mint

Obverse
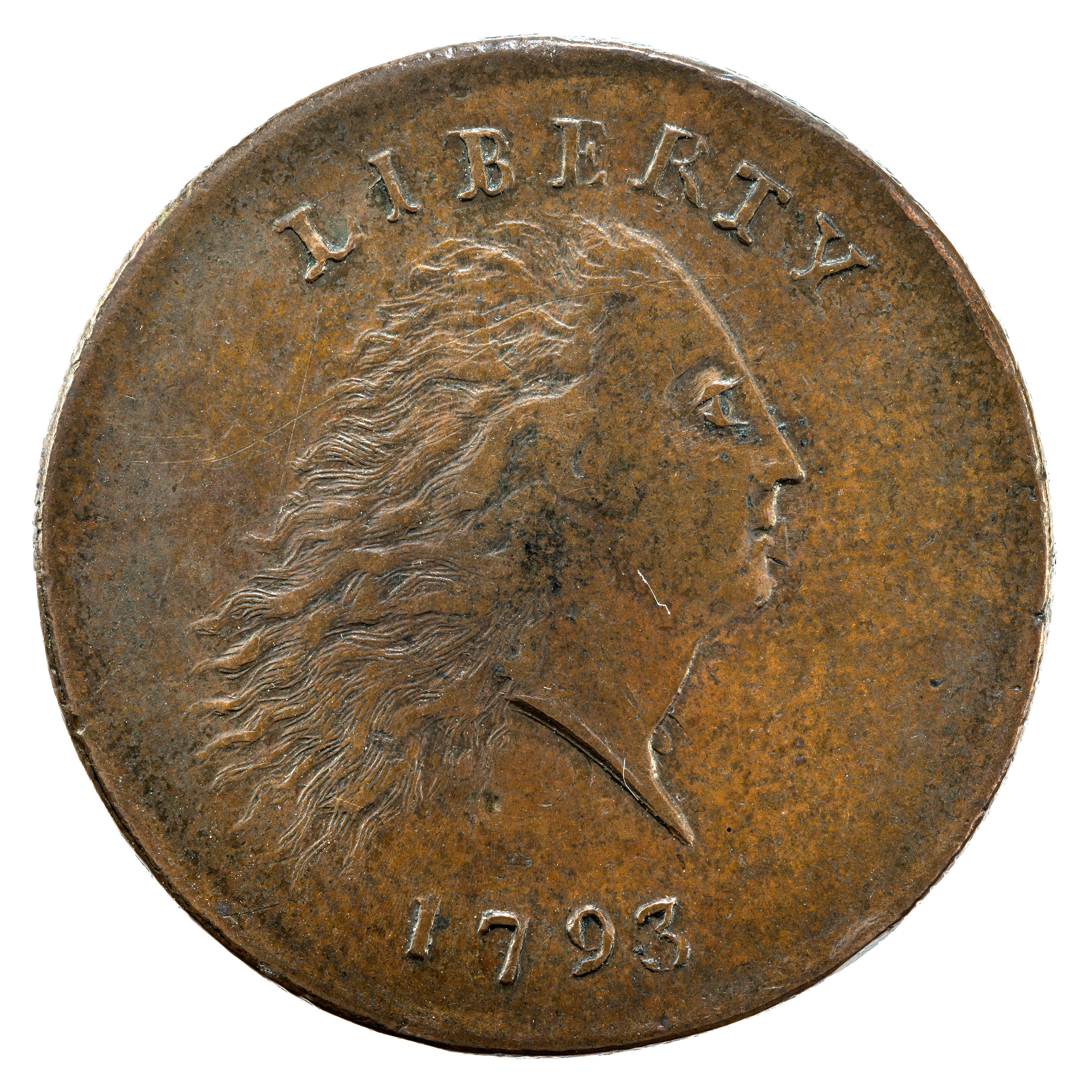
- Design: Liberty (Breen obverse 3 shown)
- Designer: Henry Voigt (supposedly)
- Design date: 1793

Reverse
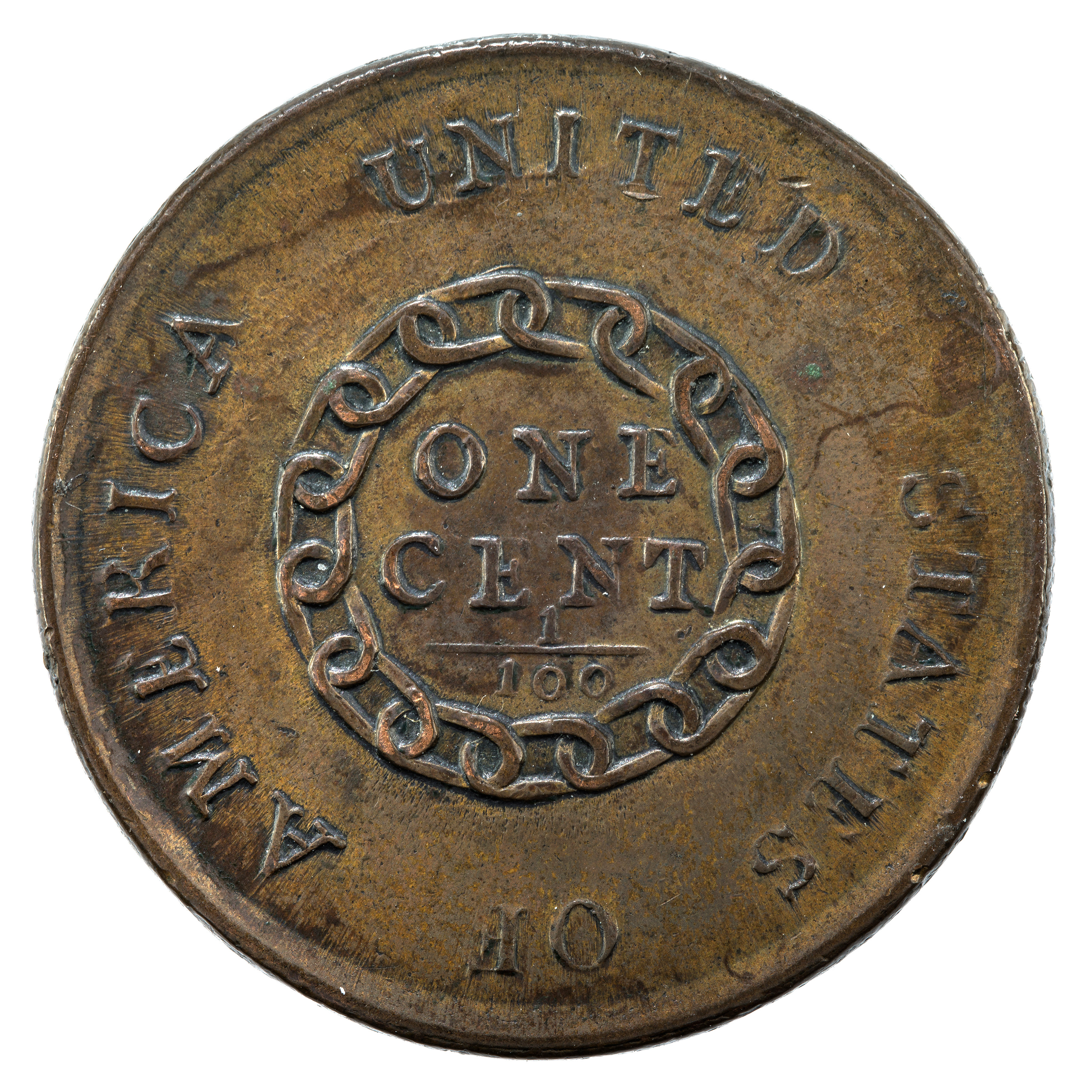
- Design: Chain (Breen reverse B shown)
- Designer: Henry Voigt (supposedly)
- Design date: 1793

The chain cent was America's first large cent and the first circulating coin officially produced by the United States Mint. It was struck only during 1793.

It was not the first circulating coin produced by the United States, which was the Fugio cent of 1787 (also known as the Franklin cent), based on the Continental dollar. As with the Fugio cent, the Chain cent was made of copper and featured a chain symbolizing the linking together of the states of the United States.

== Obverse design ==
The obverse design consisted of a stylized Liberty head with flowing hair, similar to that on the 1792 half disme but facing right. The inscription "LIBERTY" appeared above the portrait, and the date below.

== Reverse design ==
The reverse's central design figure, for which the coin is named, is an interlocking chain with 15 links, representing the fifteen American states in the Union at that time (the original Thirteen Colonies, Vermont and Kentucky). Both the words "ONE CENT" and the fraction 1/100 appear within the chain. Along the outer edge is inscribed "UNITED STATES OF AMERICA". On the first working die, the engraver failed to allow adequate room for the entire inscription, and it had to be abbreviated to "UNITED STATES OF AMERI.". These early dies were cut by hand, rather than being made from master hubs as is the practice today. (It is also said that the abbreviation was ordered by Mint Director David Rittenhouse in an attempt to "balance" the designs of the obverse and reverse).

== Edge ==
The edge of these coins is decorated with bars and vines with leaves.

== Public reaction ==
Chain cents were struck during late February and early March 1793; records indicate that approximately 36,103 were produced. However, the public reaction to the coins was largely unfavorable. One newspaper criticized the appearance of the Liberty head, saying that it appeared to be "in a fright". And, while the reverse chain had been intended to symbolize the unity of the newly formed Union (similar iconography had been utilized on the reverse of the earlier Fugio Cent and Revolutionary War era Continental currency), many commentators instead interpreted it as representative of slavery. By March, the Mint had run out of planchets, which temporarily halted striking. During this time, a new design – the Wreath cent – was quickly prepared and approved.

== Collecting ==
As a one-year only type coin and the first business strike cent, the Chain cent has always been in demand, both by collectors of large cents, as well as type collectors. Struck for about two weeks from late February until early March 1793, only about 1,000 coins are known to exist today, and even coins in the lowest grades still sell for thousands of dollars.

Preceded by Fugio cent	United States one-cent coin (1793)	Succeeded by Wreath cent
