= Henry Voigt =

American clockmaker (1738–1814)

Henry Voigt or Henry Voight (1738 – February 7, 1814) was a clockmaker, mathematical instrument maker, machine and steam engine builder, and Chief Coiner of the first United States Mint. He operated a wire mill in Reading Pennsylvania and repaired clocks and watches for Thomas Jefferson, who knew him well. In Philadelphia he participated in the development and production of the first practical steamboat with John Fitch that in 1790 traveled in a commercial operation between 1,300 and 3,000 miles at speeds estimated from 6 to 8 miles per hour. He is credited with some of the first U.S. coin designs and participated in the 1770 production (as one of the "hands" or helpers) and 1806 repair and extension of David Rittenhouse's Orrery.

== Watchmaking business ==
By 1775, Voigt had a watchmaking business in Philadelphia. He also claimed to have made himself useful during the American Revolutionary War with some of his manufacturing machines. Fitch became acquainted with Voigt the watchmaker and was impressed by his ingenuity. Following several conversations in which Voigt took an interest in the scheme, he had made such sensible suggestions that Fitch offered Voigt a share in the Company if he would help him, which Voigt agreed to do. Some years later Fitch recorded a description of Voigt as follows:

"Mr Voight is a Plain Dutchman who fears no man and will always speak his sentiments which has given offense to some of the Members of our Co., and some of them have effected to have a contemptible an opinion of his Philosophic abilities. It is true he is not a man of Letters nor mathematical Knowledge but for my own part I would depend on him more than a Franklin, a [David] Rittenhouse, an Ellicot, a [John] Nancarrow, and Matlack [Timothy Matlock], all combined, as he is a man of superior Mechanical abilities, and Very considerable Natural Philosophy; and as we have many of the first Geniuses in our Co., perhaps nearly equal to those I have mentioned, it is Certain that he has pointed out more defects than them all, and pointed out ways to remedy those defects, when consternation sat silent in every breast for the disaster."

== Steam engine ==
Fitch had been convinced by Benjamin Franklin that Daniel Bernoulli's 1753 idea of a jet propulsion boat could be made practical utilizing a steam driven water pump. Although this appeared to be much simpler and superior to his original paddle driven design, Voigt induced him rightly to give up Franklin's suggestion and retain his original objectives. Bernoulli's idea was later taken up by James Rumsey, who was able to utilize the much simpler Newcomen steam engine principles. However, he was only able to obtain speeds of about 3 miles per hour, whereas Fitch and Voigt ultimately obtained speeds of about 6 to 8 miles per hour. The first suggestion Voigt made was that they build a working model steam engine. When completed, it was the first steam engine that Fitch had ever seen. At this time, the advanced steam engines of James Watt and Matthew Boulton could not be obtained on the American continent due to British export restrictions, so that much of the development of the steam engine (and in particular, the marine steam engine) in the United States had to be developed independently.

== New religion ==
Fitch and Voigt joined together with a few friends in 1790 to try and establish a new religion called the Universal Society, in which good works would be inspired by a sense of honor rather than by supernatural suspicions and fears. Although the group ended in failure, plans and debates were made during its short duration, concerning all fundamental questions of life that could be raised. Persons of all faiths were accepted, as well as agnostics and atheists.

== Chief coiner ==
In 1791, Fitch and Voigt both applied for jobs in the new United States Mint, hoping that while they held these offices they would have time to perfect the steamboat. In their petition, Voigt was described as perfectly acquainted with all machinery and processes of coining, and capable of making the necessary instruments himself, having worked in a mint in Germany in his younger years, during which he had introduced valuable improvements. Fitch was unsuccessful in this endeavor, but Voigt obtained an appointment as Chief Coiner, a position he held for many years.

Although Voigt was married with children, he had an illicit affair with a widow and landlady, Mrs. Mary Krafft. She gave birth to two children by him. Fitch, in an attempt to save Krafft's reputation, married her. This caused a break in the Fitch–Voigt partnership. Afterward, all of Fitch's attempts to build additional steamboats were unsuccessful. Fitch later described Voigt's participation. He claimed that the principal part of the original thoughts were his own, but that he could hardly propose anything that Voigt would not make some improvement upon, and that he had left the actual execution of production and fabrication to Voigt. "He is a man most ready of mechanical improvements of any on earth, and I am persuaded that I never could have completed the steamboat without him."

== Surveying equipment ==
Several months before the Louisiana Purchase treaty was signed with France in 1803, Surveyor General Isaac Briggs (Isacc Briggs also patented a steamboat with William Longstreet on February 1, 1788. In 1807, a few days after Fulton's similarly successful experiment, they launched a boat against the current of the Savannah River, which traveled five miles an hour.) asked Andrew Ellicott for his transit and equal altitude instrument for the purpose of surveying the 828,000 square miles of territory. When Ellicott refused to sell, Briggs turned to Henry Voigt, who produced an instrument. Briggs used this Voigt instrument in 1804 to establish a prime meridian for the United States, running through Washington, D.C. and then took it to the new Territory. The resulting transit and equal altitude instrument, with the inscription "Henry Voigt Philadelphia" is now in the collection of the Smithsonian National Museum of American History.

== Orrery work ==
An orrery was purchased in 1771 from the Pennsylvania clockmaker and astronomer David Rittenhouse by Princeton University. In an 1804 Trustee meeting, the Committee on the Orrery presented a contract "with Henry Voigt (or Voight)" of Philadelphia for which he was paid $500 in 1807 for the repair of the orrery. The clockmaker Henry Voigt had long been acquainted with Rittenhouse, who was the first director of the United States Mint in Philadelphia, where in 1792 Voigt became chief coiner and first superintendent of the mint. The following inscription is on the face of the orrery: "Invented by David Rittenhouse. A.D. 1768. Repaired and extended by Henry Voigt. A.D. 1806. Both of Philadelphia." On the back side is the name Thomas Voigt, Henry's son who is assumed to have assisted in the work under Henry's direction.

"Henry Voigt died at Philadelphia, February 7, 1814 in the seventy first year of his age and was buried from the house of John Kessler Esq., corner of Fourth and Coates streets."

He is buried in Section L-204 & 205, Laurel Hill Cemetery, Philadelphia.

== See also ==
- Half cent (United States coin)
- James Rumsey
- John Fitch (inventor)
- Steamboat
- United States Mint History
