= Walking Liberty half dollar =

1916–1947 coin issued by the United States Mint

- United States
- Value: 50 cents (0.50 US dollars)
- Mass: 12.50 g
- Diameter: 30.63 mm (1.2059 in)
- Thickness: 1.8 mm
- Edge: reeded
- Composition: 90% silver; 10% copper
- Silver: 0.36169 troy oz
- Years of minting: 1916–1947
- Mint marks: D, S. Located for 1916 and some 1917 pieces on obverse to right of Liberty just under the letters "Tr" in "In God We Trust", later issues on reverse at lower left, under the tree. Philadelphia Mint specimens lack mint mark.

Obverse
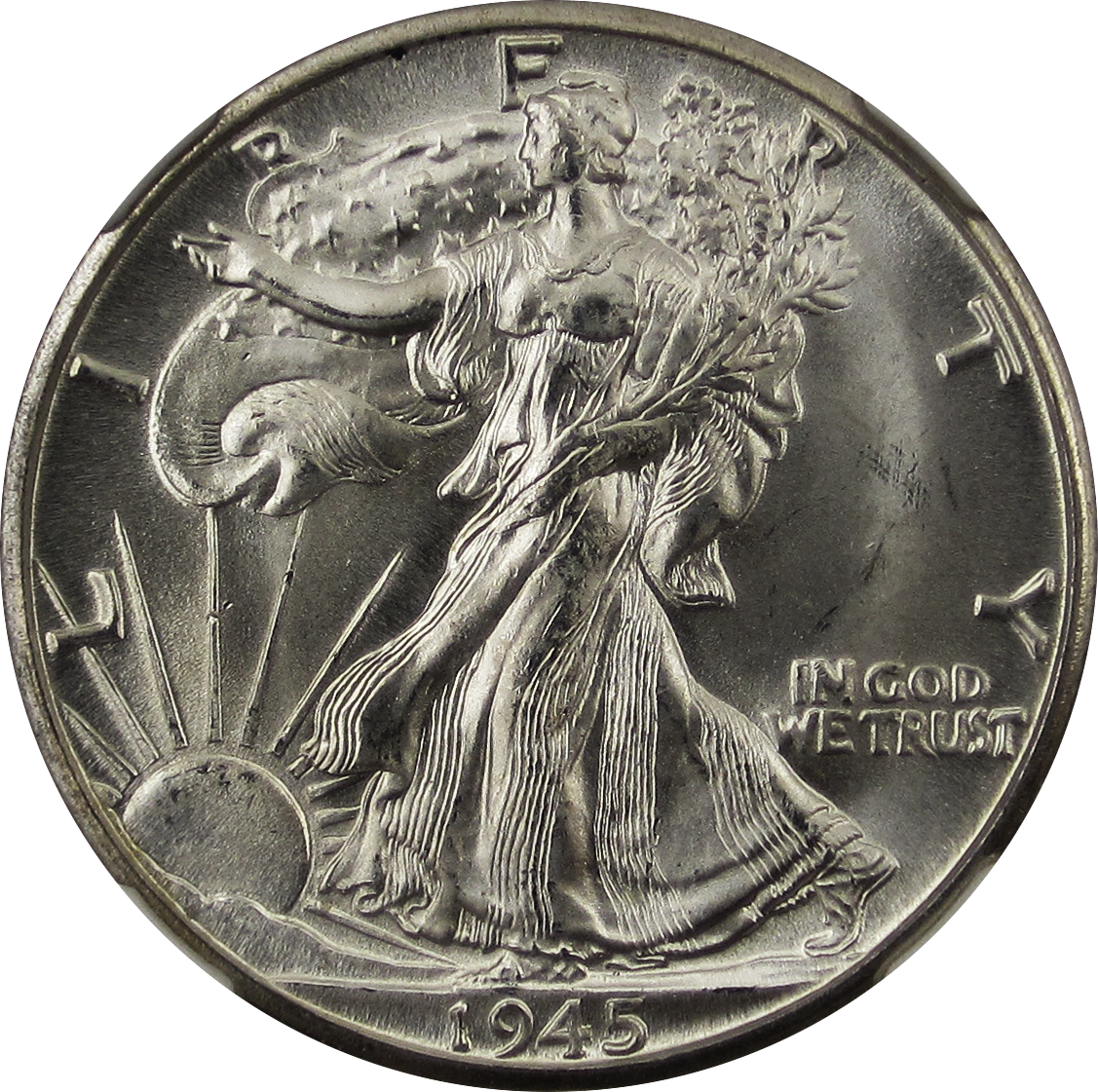
- Design: Liberty walking and holding branches; United States flag over shoulder; Sun on the eastern horizon
- Designer: Adolph A. Weinman
- Design date: 1916–1947

Reverse
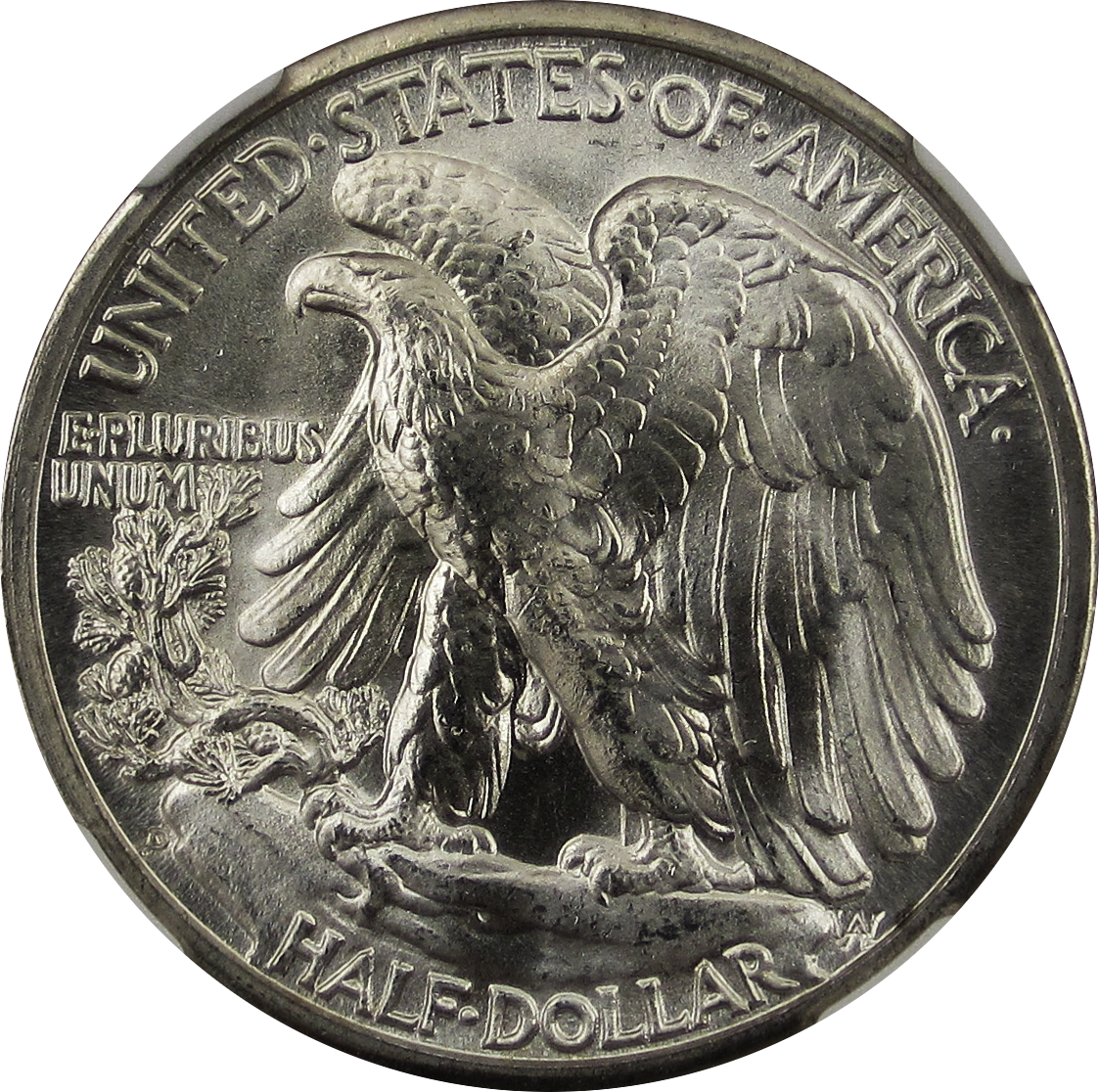
- Design: A bald eagle rising from a mountaintop perch
- Designer: Adolph A. Weinman
- Design date: 1916–1947

The Walking Liberty half dollar is a silver 50-cent piece or half dollar coin that was issued by the United States Mint from 1916 to 1947; it was designed by Adolph A. Weinman, a well-known sculptor and engraver.

In 1915, the new Mint Director, Robert W. Woolley, came to believe that he was not only allowed but required by law to replace coin designs that had been in use for 25 years. He therefore began the process of replacing the Barber coinage: dimes, quarters, and half dollars, all bearing similar designs by long-time Mint Engraver Charles E. Barber, and first struck in 1892. Woolley had the Commission of Fine Arts conduct a competition, as a result of which Weinman was selected to design the dime and half dollar.

Weinman's design of Liberty striding towards the Sun for the half dollar proved difficult to perfect, and Treasury Secretary William G. McAdoo, whose department included the Mint, considered having Barber create his own design. Mint officials were successful in getting Weinman's design into production, although it never struck very well, which may have been a factor in its replacement by the Franklin half dollar beginning in 1948. Nevertheless, art historian Cornelius Vermeule considered the piece to be among the most beautiful US coins. Since 1986, a modification of Weinman's obverse design has been used for the American Silver Eagle, and the half dollar was issued in gold for its centennial in 2016.

== Inception ==
On September 26, 1890, the United States Congress passed an act providing:

The Director of the Mint shall have power, with the approval of the Secretary of the Treasury, to cause new designs ... to be prepared and adopted ... But no change in the design or die of any coin shall be made oftener than once in twenty-five years from and including the year of the first adoption of the design ... But the Director of the Mint shall nevertheless have power, with the approval of the Secretary of the Treasury, to engage temporarily the services of one or more artists, distinguished in their respective departments of art, who shall be paid for such service from the contingent appropriation for the mint at Philadelphia.

The Barber coinage was introduced in 1892; dimes, quarter dollars, and half dollars with similar designs by Mint Engraver Charles E. Barber. The new pieces attracted considerable public dissatisfaction. Beginning in 1905, successive presidential administrations had attempted to bring modern, beautiful designs to United States coins. Following the redesign of the double eagle, eagle, half eagle and quarter eagle in 1907 and 1908, as well as the cent and nickel redesigns of 1909 and 1913 respectively, advocates of replacing the Barber coins began to push for the change when the coins' minimum term expired in 1916. As early as 1914, Victor David Brenner, designer of the Lincoln cent, submitted unsolicited designs for the silver coins. He was told in response that Secretary of the Treasury William G. McAdoo was completely occupied with other matters.

On January 2, 1915, an interview with Philadelphia Mint Superintendent Adam M. Joyce appeared in the Michigan Manufacturer and Financial Record:

So far as I know ... there is no thought of issuing new coins of the 50-cent, 25-cent, and 10-cent values. If, however, a change is made we all hope that more serviceable and satisfactory coins are produced than the recent Saint-Gaudens double eagle and eagle and the Pratt half and quarter eagle. The buffalo nickel and the Lincoln penny are also faulty from a practical standpoint. All resulted from the desire by the government to mint coins to the satisfaction of artists and not practical coiners.

In January 1915, Assistant Secretary of the Treasury William P. Malburn sent McAdoo a memorandum about the silver subsidiary coinage, noting that "the present silver half dollar, quarter, and dime were changed in 1892, and a new design may, therefore, be adopted in 1916. This can be done any time in the year." In reply, McAdoo wrote "let the mint submit designs before we try anyone else" on the memorandum.

In April 1915, Robert W. Woolley took office as Mint Director. On April 14, he asked Joyce to request Engraver Barber, then in his 36th year in office, to prepare new designs. The same day, Malburn requested the opinion of the Treasury Department's Solicitor concerning the Mint view that it could strike new designs for the three denominations in 1916. On April 17, the Solicitor's Office responded that the Mint could change the designs. At the time, the Mint was intensely busy producing the Panama-Pacific commemorative coin issue, and immediate action was not taken. In October, Barber was summoned to Washington to discuss coin designs with Woolley, although it is uncertain whether or not he had by then prepared sketches for the new coinage.

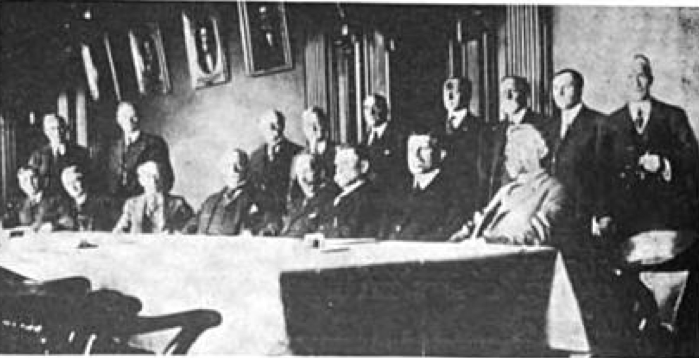
The 1916 United States Assay Commission met on February 9 and February 10, 1916 to test coins from the previous year to ensure they met specifications. Among the members and Mint officials shown were Mint Director Robert W. Woolley (standing fourth from left), Engraver to the United States Mint in Philadelphia Charles E. Barber (standing third from left) and Philadelphia Mint Superintendent Adam Joyce (standing at far right).

On December 3, Woolley met with the Commission of Fine Arts. Woolley asked the Commission to view sketches produced by the Mint's engraving department. Barber was present to explain the coinage process to the Commission members. Woolley suggested to the members that if they did not like the Mint's work, they should select sculptors to submit designs for the new pieces. It was Woolley's intent to have distinct designs for the dime, quarter and half dollar—previously, the three pieces had been near-identical. The director informed the Commission that as the existing coinage had been in use for 25 years, it would have to be changed—which numismatic historian David Lange calls a "misinterpretation of the coinage laws".

The Commission disliked the sketches from the Mint (submitted by Barber) and selected sculptors Adolph Weinman, Hermon MacNeil and Albin Polasek to submit proposals for the new coins. The sculptors could submit multiple sketches. Although the Mint could decide to use a design on a denomination not intended by its sculptor, the designs were not fully interchangeable—by statute, an eagle had to appear on the reverse of the quarter and half dollar, but could not appear on the dime. Woolley hoped that each sculptor would be successful with one piece.

The three sculptors submitted design sketches in mid-February, and on February 23 met with Woolley in New York City to make presentations of their work and answer his questions. After discussions between Woolley and McAdoo, Weinman was notified on February 28 that five of his sketches had been selected—for the dime and half dollar, and the reverse of the quarter. The same day, Woolley wrote to MacNeil to tell him he would sculpt the quarter's obverse, and to Polasek to inform him of his lack of success. Members of the Commission persuaded Woolley that so much should not be entrusted to a single artist, and MacNeil was allowed to design both sides of the quarter, subject to the sculptor producing a design satisfactory to Woolley.

On March 3, the new coins were publicly announced, with the Treasury noting, "[d]esigns of these coins must be changed by law every 25 years and the present 25-year period ends with 1916." The press release indicated that the Treasury hoped production of the new coins would begin in about two months, once the designs were finalized. The same day, Woolley wrote to Mint Engraver Barber, telling him that his sketches were rejected and that models from Weinman and MacNeil would arrive at the Philadelphia Mint no later than May 1. According to numismatic historian Walter Breen, Barber became "sullen and totally uncooperative". Lange notes that "numerous delays were encountered as the artists fine-tuned their models while simultaneously avoiding obstacles thrown in their path by Barber. While his observations regarding many aspects of practical coinage were quite accurate, they clearly could have been presented in a more constructive manner." In his book on Mercury dimes, Lange notes that Barber, by then aged 75, had been "compelled over the past ten years to participate in the systematic undoing of a lifetime's achievements"; he had to participate in the process which resulted in coins designed by others replacing ones designed by him.

With the new pieces, all American coins would have had a recent change of design (the Morgan dollar was not then being struck). According to a column in The Art World magazine later in 1916,

Since that day [the 19th century] much artistic progress has taken place in our coinage. Sculptors of reputation have been employed with admirable results ...And now we are to have a new half dollar and a new dime by Weinman and a new quarter by McNeill [sic]. Altogether, in the retrospect, it seems an incredible achievement.

== Design ==
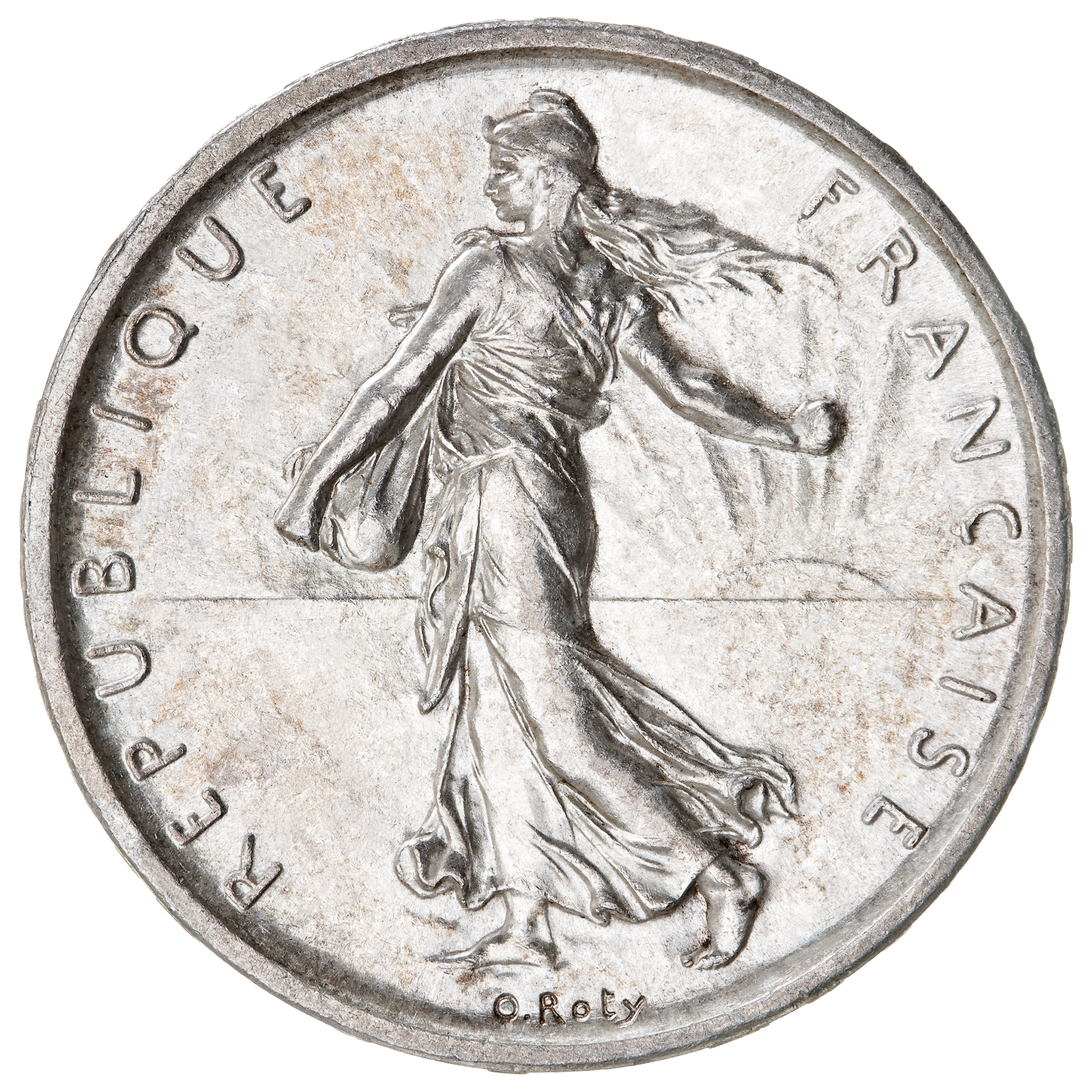
Oscar Roty's "Sower" design for French coins may have inspired Weinman's obverse.

According to Secretary McAdoo in his 1916 annual report,

The design of the half dollar bears a full-length figure of Liberty, the folds of the Stars and Stripes flying to the breeze as a background, progressing in full stride toward the dawn of a new day, carrying branches of laurel and oak, symbolical of civil and military glory. The hand of the figure is outstretched in bestowal of the spirit of liberty. The reverse of the half dollar shows an eagle perched high upon a mountain crag, his wings unfolded, fearless in spirit and conscious of his power. Springing from a rift in the rock is a sapling of mountain pine, symbolical of America.

Weinman's obverse bears a resemblance to Oscar Roty's "Sower" design for French coins; according to numismatic historian Roger Burdette "Weinman has taken the ideal of a nineteenth century provincial figure and turned it into an American icon". (Note: The Sower still appears on the 10, 20 and 50 euro cent French coins.) Burdette ties both the appearance of the head of Liberty and of the branches which she carries to Baltimore's Union Soldiers and Sailors Monument, designed by Weinman. The sculptor may also have drawn inspiration from a 1913 bust he did of his tenant, Elsie Stevens, wife of lawyer and poet Wallace Stevens. Elsie Stevens is generally believed to have been a model for Weinman's Mercury dime; her daughter Holly wrote in 1966 that her mother had been the model for both coins. The reverse is similar to Weinman's medal for the American Institute of Architects, although the sculptor replaced the laurel on the medal with a pine sapling. Weinman's work on the medal had been widely admired for the power of the depicted eagle.

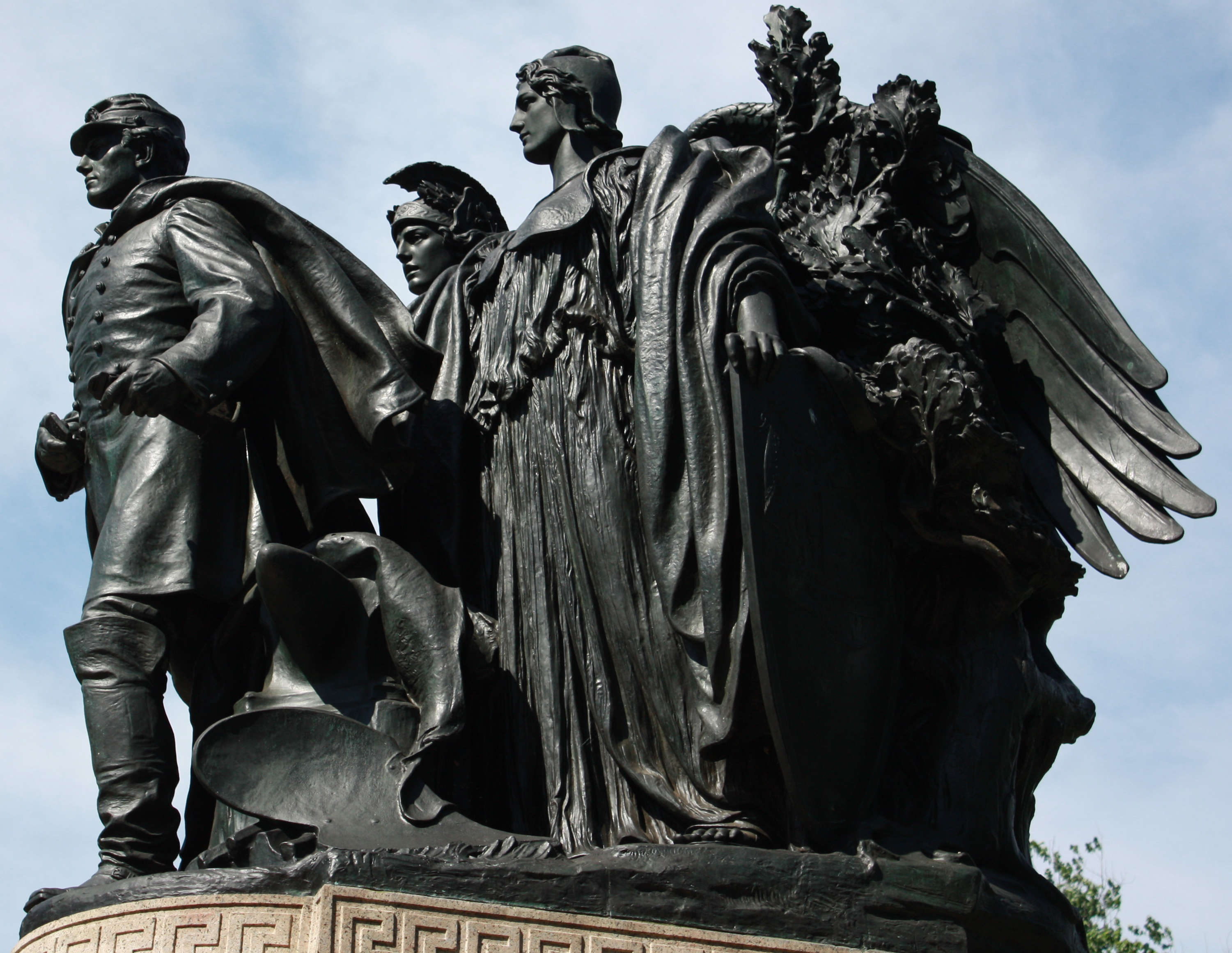
Weinman's 1909 Union Soldiers and Sailors Monument may have given him his head of Liberty (from the head of Victory, on right) and displays similar use of foliage.

Breen, in his comprehensive volume on US coins, said of the half dollar "Ms. Liberty wears the American flag, anticipating a rebellious counterculture by half a century". Though admiring the piece generally, he noted that Liberty is striding towards the east, that is towards war-torn Europe, and wrote "she points into the sky at nothing visible (perhaps aiming a warning at German warplanes?)". Breen objects to the use of the mountain pine on the reverse, calling it not particularly American nor especially notable except for an ability to thrive near the tree line.

Art historian Cornelius Vermeule wrote that the Walking Liberty half dollar "really treat[s] the obverse and reverse as a surface sculptural ensemble. The 'Walking Liberty' design particularly gives the true feeling of breath and sculptural services on the scale of a coin." Vermeule noted the resemblance of the half dollar to Roty's "Sower" but states that Weinman's piece "is an original creation, not a slavish copy". On the reverse, Vermeule admired the eagle, which dominates but does not overwhelm the design, and stated that the bird's feathers are "a marvelous tour de force", showing the influence of Augustus Saint-Gaudens, under whom Weinman studied. Vermeule characterized the Walking Liberty half dollar to be "one of the greatest coins of the United States—if not of the world".

== Preparation ==
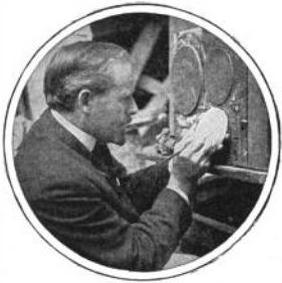
Sculptor Adolph Weinman

The three sculptors met with Woolley on March 6, 1916 at the New York Assay Office to be formally told of the outcome of the competition, including the change in the outcome for the quarter, and to receive back rejected models and sketches. Polasek, who received his participation fee of $300 (Note: equal to $8,876 in 2025 adjusted for inflation) on March 10, never again had any connection with the Mint or coinage design. Until a plaster model of one of his submissions was discovered at the Polasek Museum (formerly his house) in 2002, his participation was known only through the Mint's records.

After Weinman's success in the competition, he visited the Mint to discuss the conversion of his models to finished dies. On his first visit, he found Barber absent but had a productive talk with long-time Assistant Engraver George T. Morgan. Other visits followed, and on March 29, Woolley wrote to Superintendent Joyce "confidentially, the sculptors designing the new coins felt that on their last trip Mr. Morgan was much more cordial and cooperative than Mr. Barber was. I realize I am dealing with artistic temperaments at both ends." Woolley came to New York twice in April to examine MacNeil's evolving reverse design for the quarter, on May 26 he also visited Weinman's studio and viewed progress on the models of his designs. A severe case of tonsillitis delayed Weinman's work, and caused him to request an extension of the May 1 deadline. On May 29, Woolley wrote Weinman that the designs, both for the dime and half dollar, were accepted by the Mint.

During June, the Mint's engraving department, headed by Barber, reduced the models to coin-sized hubs and prepared dies for experimental pattern coins, which were subsequently struck. Woolley hoped to begin production of the new coins of all three denominations by July 1, but the grant of time to Weinman required the Mint to act with greater speed. Burdette suggests the haste with which the dies were prepared caused coins struck with them to appear worn and without sharp detail.

By June 22, Weinman had viewed the first patterns, as he wrote to Woolley stating that he did not like the way the word "Liberty" on the obverse had turned out, and asking for the loan of two patterns so he could redo the lettering. On June 24, Woolley wrote to Joyce, informing him of the loan and stating of the new pieces,

The model of the obverse on the half dollar will have to be made over and Mr. Weinman informs me he is now at work on it. The same is true of the quarter dollar. The reverse of both the quarter dollar and the half dollar, as shown on the coins struck from the polished dies, are satisfactory ... Everyone to whom the coins have been shown here thinks they are beautiful.

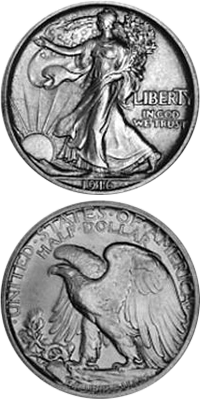
Pattern coin for the Walking Liberty half dollar, showing Weinman's design with the large figure of Liberty for the obverse and his original reverse

With Woolley's permission to redo the obverse, Weinman decided to remove the word "Liberty" from above the figure and place it above "In God We Trust" to the right of it. This permitted him to extend Liberty's head almost to the top of the coin, maximizing the size of the depiction. The letter "L" was placed in the concavity formed by the flag as it drapes under the figure's left elbow, and the rest of the word extended to the right from there, with the letter T in larger print, actually saving room as the larger size allowed the crossbar of the "T" to extend above the capitalized letters "R" and "Y". This allowed the letters to be squeezed closer together. When Woolley resigned on July 15 to become director of publicity for Woodrow Wilson's reelection campaign (a function he also fulfilled for Democratic nominees in 1912 and 1920), he mentioned in his resignation letter to Secretary McAdoo (Wilson's son-in-law), "in working over the model for the obverse side of the half dollar Mr. Weinman is making a slight rearrangement of the word 'Liberty', and will have it ready for your inspection in a few days. I like it and believe you will." Weinman wrote to the former director on July 20 that increasing the size of the figure of Liberty improved its appearance.

McAdoo accepted Weinman's revised design on July 26; at that time Fred H. Chaffin, Adjuster of the Bureau of the Mint, was serving as Acting Mint Director until President Wilson could nominate a replacement for Woolley and have him confirmed by the Senate. Weinman decided, on his own initiative, to rearrange the legends on the reverse. On the original pattern, "United States of America" is at the top of the reverse, with "Half Dollar" directly below and "E Pluribus Unum" at the bottom of the coin. Weinman's revision has the legends in the places they would occupy on the circulation strikes and was approved by McAdoo on August 10. On August 18, Wilson nominated Woolley's successor, Friedrich Johannes Hugo von Engelken, who was promptly confirmed by the Senate. Von Engelken was supposed to be sworn in on August 21; his swearing in was delayed until September 1 by President Wilson's failure to sign his commission.

== Modification ==
When von Engelken took office as Mint Director on September 1, 1916, the half dollar had been approved, and pattern coins had been struck. Actual production of the 50-cent piece was delayed as the Mint struggled to finalize Weinman's Mercury dime. On September 6, production of the dime was halted as companies testing the new 10-cent piece found that the new pieces would not work in vending machines. The defect was found to be a "fin", excess metal at the edge of the coin, making it seem too thick when inserted in machines. The fin could also break off, leaving the silver coins underweight. The problem was found on the pattern half dollars as well. On September 6, von Engelken wrote to Assistant Secretary Malburn, using information that Burdette suggests came from Barber:

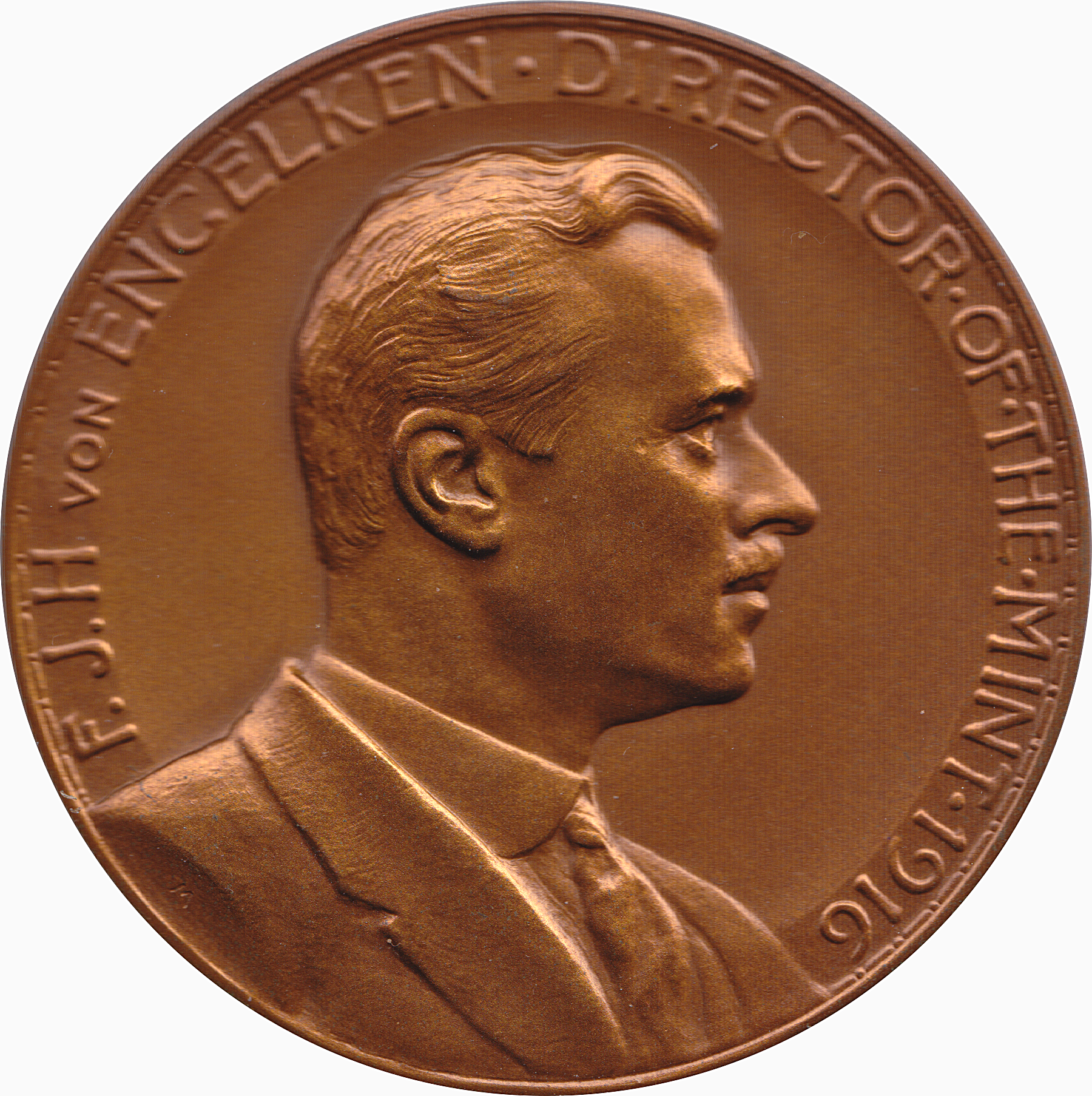
Mint Director Friedrich Johannes Hugo von Engelken

I am sending you with this letter ten of the new dimes and one of the new half dollars. If you examine these coins carefully, you will find that they are decidedly imperfect. You will note both on the half dollar and the ten cent piece a sharp projection of the metal on the edge, which is the "fin" to which I have referred. You will note also, particularly on the half dollar on account of its size, a variation in the thickness of the coin, specifically noticeable at the edge. I went to Philadelphia yesterday to ascertain whether or not this could be overcome, and I find that we are faced with certain mechanical restrictions which make it impossible to produce a coin of uniform thickness of edge, and to obviate the fin edge, as long as we maintain the high relief of the coin as it is at present.

Von Engelken's letter caused concern in the Secretary's office—McAdoo feared that if the Mint proved unable to successfully issue new coins, the Republicans might exploit the failure as an issue in the presidential race. The Secretary enquired how long it would take "our Mr. Barber" to produce new designs; after consultation with officials at the Philadelphia Mint, von Engelken replied that it would take six to eight months. (Note: Chief Engraver Barber died in office on February 18, 1917, five and a half months later.) The two officials decided that Weinman must be asked to modify his design for the half dollar—it was hoped that if Weinman shrank the figure of Liberty, and lowered the relief, the piece would prove coinable.

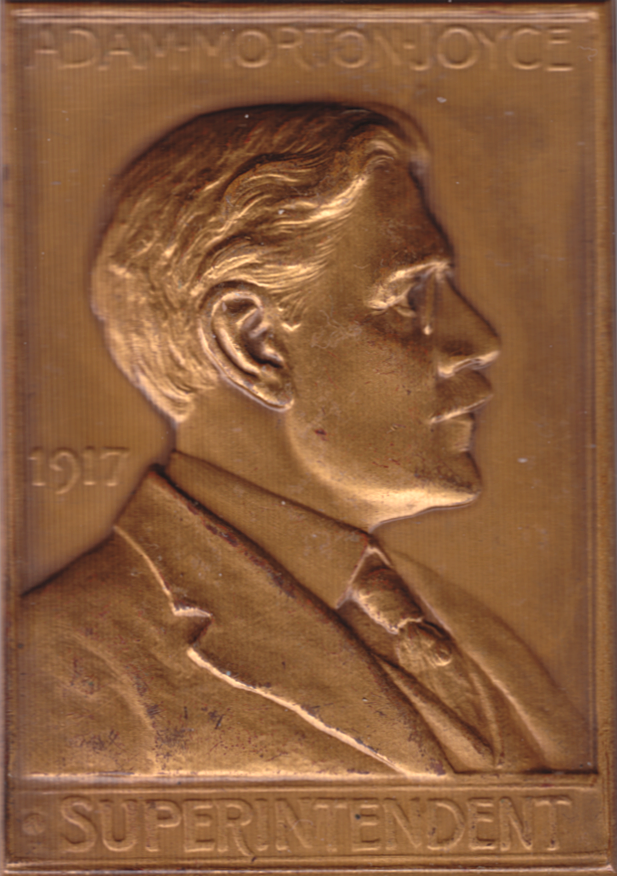
Philadelphia Mint Superintendent Adam M. Joyce

Weinman arrived at the Mint on September 11. He left with two pattern half dollars and instructions to reduce the size of the figure of Liberty. Barber appealed to Joyce for permission to make major changes to Weinman's design, but this was initially refused. However, when an additional change by Weinman failed to eliminate the fin problem, Joyce gave in and allowed Barber a free hand. Engraver Barber shrank the design, moving the design further from the edge, and creating a wide space between design and rim. Barber insisted that this was the only way to prevent a fin and uneven edge. A beaded border was added within the rim. According to Burdette, patterns struck from the new dies were dull and uninteresting, as the size of the figures had lent them strength.

On October 18, Weinman wrote to Joyce, asking how the Mint was getting on with the dies for the half dollar and dime, and expressing his willingness to come to Philadelphia. Joyce replied two days later, informing him that the design of the half dollar was being reduced in size to prevent recurrence of the edge difficulties, and informing him of the beaded border. Weinman responded hoping that Joyce would prevent the figure of Liberty from being unduly reduced and rendering his account. As the sculptor and superintendent corresponded, the Mint began the work of converting the Barber-modified designs to working dies from which circulation coins could be struck, but Joyce interceded before coining could begin. The Philadelphia Mint superintendent, who had the support of von Engelken, felt that Barber's modifications were unnecessary. Joyce believed that coins closer to Weinman's concept could be struck by lowering the relief slightly, adjusting the force with which the Mint's presses struck the planchets or blanks, and better preparing the planchets for striking. Joyce's position prevailed, and Barber and his department prepared working dies for striking of circulation pieces, omitting Barber's beaded border and wide space between rim and design. Working dies were at the Denver and San Francisco Mints on November 27, and production began at all three mints soon after.

In late December Weinman, who had received no update from the Mint since being told of the Barber modifications, but who had read in the newspapers that the half dollars were being struck, sent a $10 money order to Joyce with a request for 20 of the new coins. On January 2, 1917, Weinman wrote to Joyce again, telling him the new pieces had been received in time to be given as New Year's gifts, and wishing the superintendent "every good wish to you for every day of the New Year and with thanks to the Almighty and yourself that the beads are not on the border of the Half Dollar".

== Reception ==
Although the dime's debut on October 30, 1916 had seen considerable publicity, the Mint had little comment on the release of the half dollar and Standing Liberty quarter the following January. There were few newspaper mentions of the new half dollar; the United States was moving towards war with Germany, and the dime release had exhausted much of the public interest in the novelty of new coins. The quarter dominated what public attention there was with an argument over whether the eagle on its reverse was portrayed accurately. Despite the minimal publicity, according to a January 1917 report from Mint Adjuster Chaffin, all three mints initially had trouble keeping up with public demand for the new half dollars.

The New York Times noted on January 3 that the new pieces had been received by the Sub-Treasury and would be released two to a customer, starting on January 9. It stated that the Mint was working as hard as possible to keep up with demand, but that initially, quantities would be limited. Banking, the journal of the American Bankers Association, stated that "The designs of the new coins have been highly praised by those having expert knowledge of such matters". Connecticut's Meriden Daily Journal predicted readers would like the new half dollar five times as much as the new dime.

The Huntsville (Alabama) Mercury, however, expressed its dislike of the new half dollar. In a piece entitled "New half dollar is sick", it stated:

The new coin is radically different from all other monies produced by the government mints. A suffragette is shown sowing small stars in a western field that hasn’t been plowed very deeply. The sun is setting and the old girl looks rather tired from her day’s labors, in fact, perspiration can be seen trickling from her forehead. The lady wears sandals and her feet are rather dusty. She also appears, to have on overalls under her thin dress. She carries a load of firewood in one arm and wears a large napkin around her neck which leads to the belief that she left a small child at the house. The wind is blowing from the north and the sun has a blizzardly appearance. In great letters LIBERTY is spelled, extending more than half way around the entire surface. On the other side appears an eagle, grown to enormous size and marching madly toward Mexico, a cactus bush being shown in the background. The eagle has raised his wing as if to strike; the old fellow looks like he could put up a good fight if aroused but he has a swell crop of feathers on his legs.

== Production and collecting ==
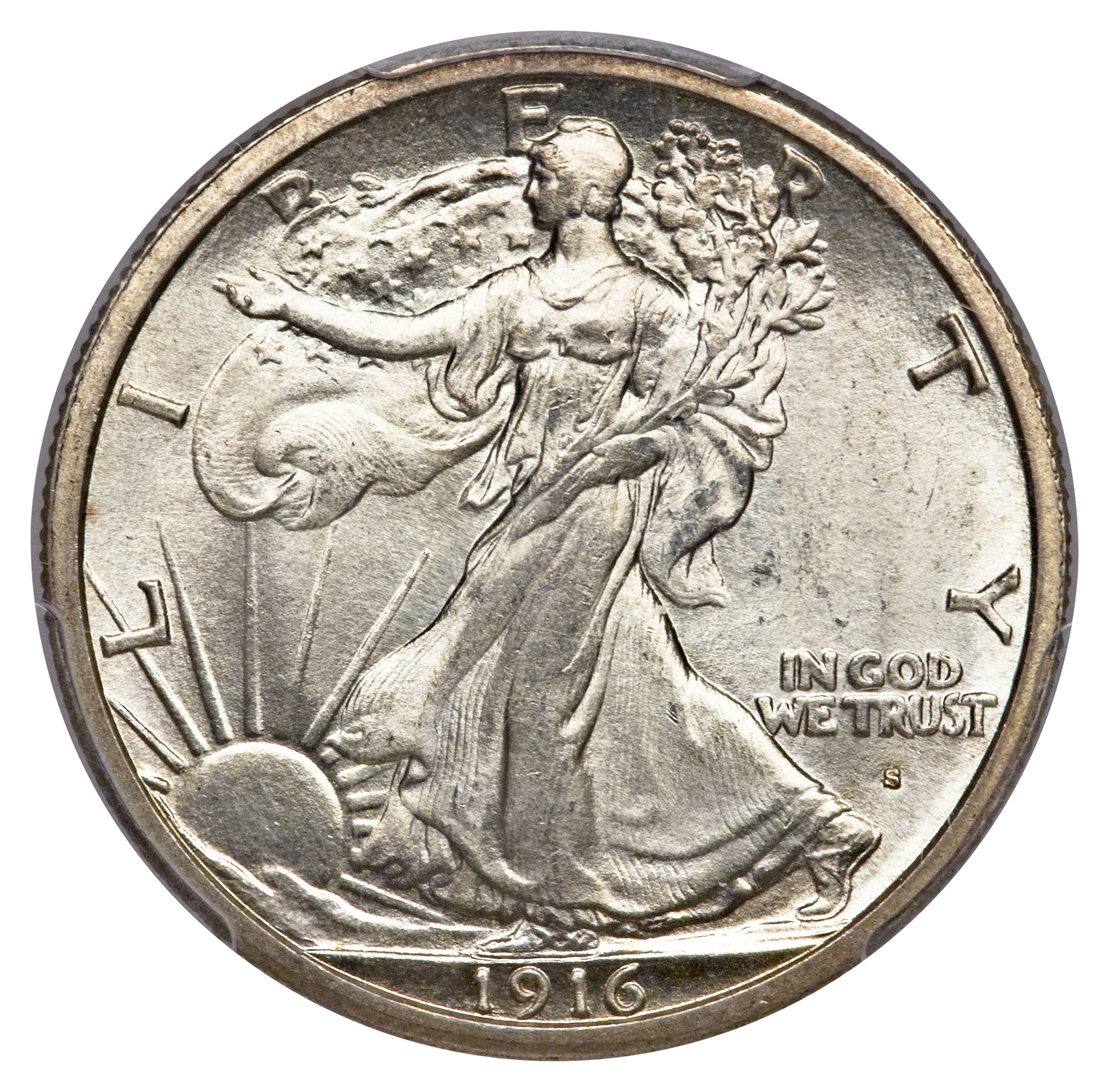
A 1916-S half dollar with the mint mark on the obverse.

The mint marks had initially been placed on the obverse, the first time that had been done for a regular issue US half dollar since 1839. On February 14, 1917, von Engelken ordered that the mint mark be moved from the obverse to the reverse, stating that the obverse placement had the appearance of a die defect. At that time, Von Engelken had resigned pending appointment to the post of president of the Federal Land Bank for the Third District; once he left to take that position, he was succeeded by Raymond T. Baker. In April Joyce asked Baker for written confirmation of von Engelken's order, and after he obliged, the mint mark was duly moved. The majority of the 1917 half dollars struck at Denver (1917-D) and San Francisco (1917-S) bear the mint mark on the reverse.

Throughout the time in which the Mint struck the Walking Liberty half dollar, it had difficulty bringing out the design fully. According to Breen,

Mint authorities knew well that the Weinman design, despite its great artistic merit, no matter how thorough Barber's original attempt to reduce relief, was technically unsatisfactory. Areas of highest relief still opposed relief areas on the other side.

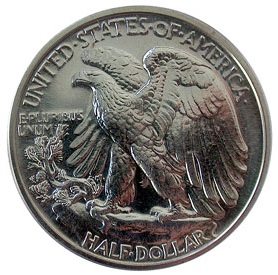
This 1941 proof coin lacks Weinman's monogram, normally placed near the rim of the coin at the lower right.

The San Francisco Mint especially had difficulty with the coins; many pieces struck there are noticeably weak. In 1918 Morgan, who had succeeded Barber as Engraver after the latter's death the previous year, modified the design, incising some of the details at Liberty's neck. According to Breen "The attempt was a failure". Morgan's successor, John R. Sinnock, made additional attempts in 1937 and 1938, with little better results. Breen suggested that the difficulties in striking the piece contributed to the willingness to replace it after World War II.

No Walking Liberty half dollar is especially rare, but many dates are scarce in mint state condition, particularly the 1921 and 1921-D. The Mint struck proof coins in 1916–1917 and 1936–1942, all at Philadelphia. The 1916 pieces were struck in very small numbers—Breen stated that he had seen only four—and only three 1917 proof coins are confirmed, most likely struck for VIPs at a time when proof coins were not sold to the public. A number of the later proof coins lack Weinman's monogram, apparently lost through overpolishing of dies. This is most common with the 1941 proof pieces—much of the year's production lacks the monogram—but is known for other years. A total of 74,400 proof coins were struck for the series.

There are few varieties in the series, and they are relatively minor. They principally involve the mint mark: several repunchings, one overpunching of a D over an S in 1942, and some changes in letter size. One oddity is the 1943/1942, which is not a true overdate but was formed by a working die struck once from a 1942-dated master die, and once from one dated 1943. Some 1946 half dollars show a doubled die on the reverse.

== Replacement ==
In 1947, Mint Director Nellie Tayloe Ross asked Engraver Sinnock to produce a design for a half dollar featuring Founding Father Benjamin Franklin. Ross had long been an admirer of Franklin, and wanted to see him on a coin. Mint officials had considered putting Franklin on the dime in 1941, but the project was shelved owing to heavy demands on the Mint for coins as the United States entered World War II. During the war, the Mint contemplated adding one or more new denominations of coinage; Sinnock prepared a Franklin design in anticipation of a new issue, which did not occur. In 1946, the Treasury replaced the Mercury dime with a piece depicting the recently deceased president, Franklin Roosevelt, who had been closely associated with the March of Dimes. With the Lincoln cent popular and politically inexpedient to replace, the half dollar was the only piece being struck which was available for redesign without congressional permission. The Treasury approved the new design. Although Sinnock died before the coin was issued, the Franklin half dollar went into production at the start of 1948, ending the Walking Liberty series. A total of 485,320,340 Walking Liberty half dollars were struck.

== Design reuse ==
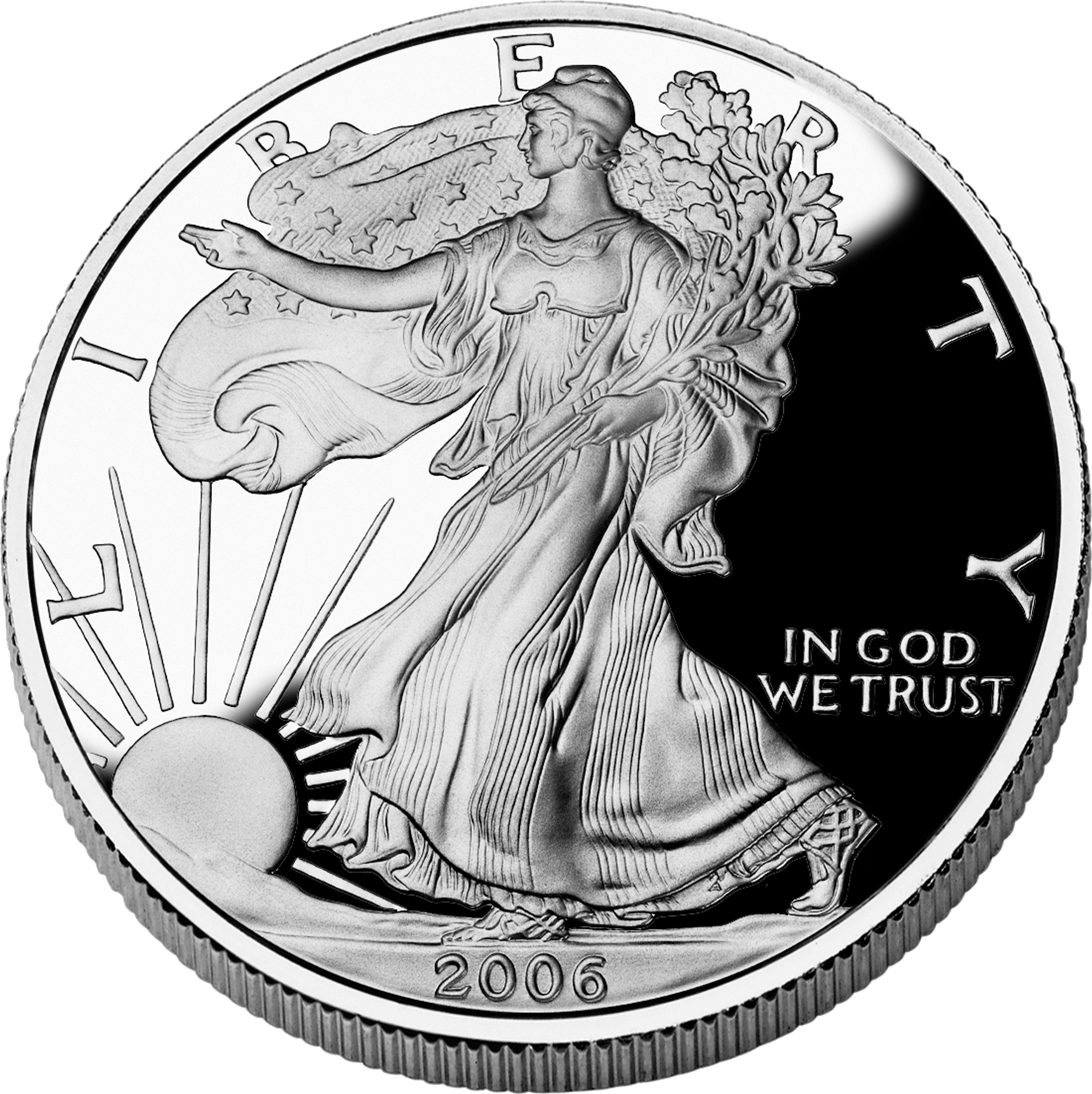
The American Silver Eagle reproduces Weinman's obverse design, and since 1986 has been the official silver bullion coin of the United States.

Since 1986, Weinman's obverse design has been used as the obverse design for the American Silver Eagle bullion coin. In adapting the design, Mint Sculptor-Engraver John Mercanti and other members of the engraving staff strengthened many of the details. Mercanti noted that Weinman's original plaster was only 6 inches (150 mm) in diameter, and was softly modeled. Mercanti increased the detail so that the design, struck on a larger coin, would be bolder and would have a more even metal flow when struck than Weinman's original coin. Treasury Secretary James Baker chose a heraldic eagle design, by Mercanti, as the reverse of the American Silver Eagle.

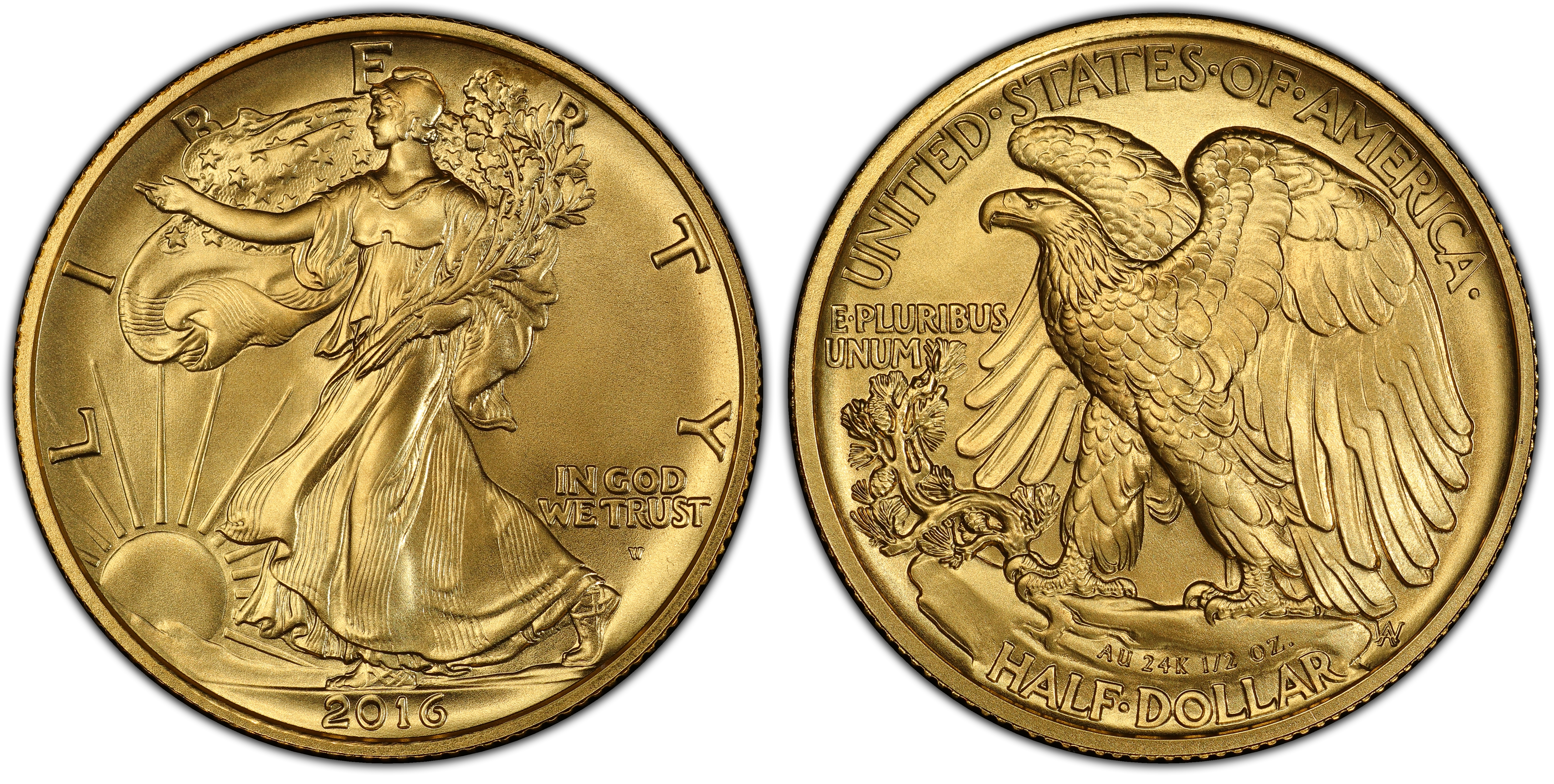
The 100th anniversary 2016-W Walking Liberty half dollar struck in gold for collectors.

The United States Mint in 2015 announced plans to restrike, in gold for collectors, the three silver coins first issued in 1916. This coin has the weight and fineness of gold, thus technically making it a bullion coin. The gold version of the Walking Liberty half dollar, containing a half ounce of gold and struck at the West Point Mint, went on sale to the public on November 17, 2016. A maximum of 75,000 were minted at the West Point Mint (mint mark "W" appears at the same place as on regular issues of this coin).

In September 2025, the Mint announced it would re-issue the gold version in 2026, with a 1916 date and a Liberty Bell privy mark. The gold coin will be accompanied by a silver medal as part of the 2026 "Best of the Mint" commemoration, part of the observance of the 250th anniversary of American independence.
