= 1894-S Barber dime =

Rare variety of the United States ten cent coin

Dime ($0.10)
- United States
- Value: 0.10 U.S. dollars
- Mass: 2.50 g
- Diameter: 17.9 mm (0.705 in)
- Thickness: 1.35 mm (0.053 in)
- Edge: Reeded
- Composition: 90% Silver, 10% Copper
- Years of minting: 1894

Obverse
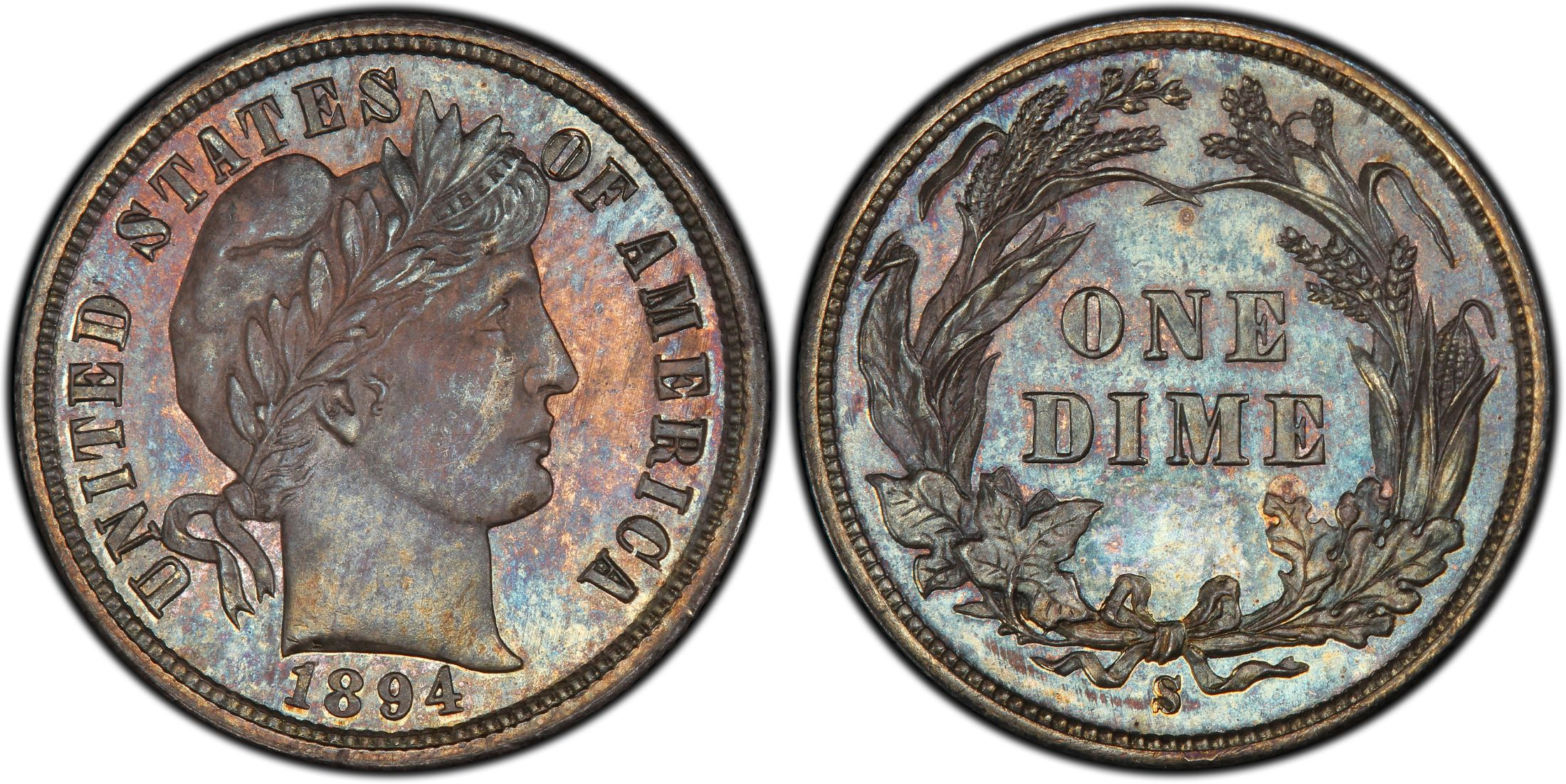
- Design: Lady Liberty with cap and cropped hair
- Designer: Charles E. Barber
- Design date: 1892

Reverse
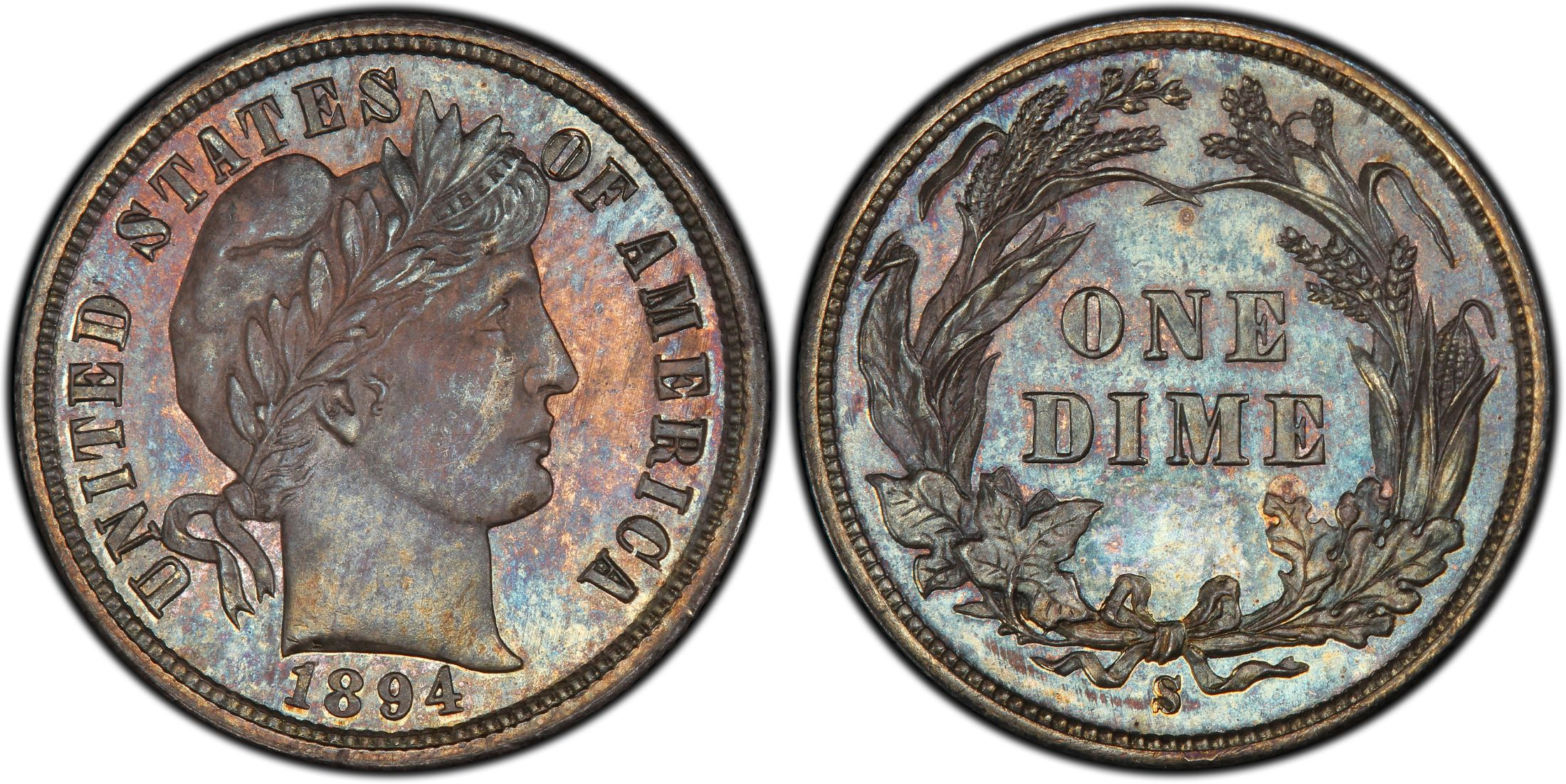
- Design: Wreath circling the words "ONE DIME"
- Designer: Charles E. Barber
- Design date: 1892

The 1894-S Barber dime is a dime produced in the United States Barber coinage. It is one of the rarest and most highly prized United States coins for collectors, along with the 1804 dollar and the 1913 Liberty Head nickel. One was sold in 2005 for $1.3 million, and another for $1.9 million in 2007. Only 24 were minted, and of those, only nine are known to survive; all nine (as was the entire mintage) were proof coins; two are heavily worn impaired proofs. In 1957, one of the latter was found in a junk coin box at Gimbels Department Store, and purchased for $2.40.

== History ==
In the first half of 1894, 24 Barber dimes were struck as proofs at the San Francisco Mint. Why only 24 of the coins were minted is unknown. The superintendent of the San Francisco Mint is said to have had them minted as gifts for some important bankers. Another theory is that the mint's annual audit showed a discrepancy of $2.40, so the dimes were struck to compensate for this. Three of the dimes were said to have been given to the superintendent's daughter, who allegedly spent one on a dish of ice cream and sold the other two in the 1950s. An entry in A Guide Book of United States Coins has a notation that five coins were reserved for assay.

== Value ==
Due to the rarity of the coin and the mysteries surrounding its past, the 1894-S dime is one of the most valuable coins produced in the United States. In the late 1990s, one of the remaining 1894-S dimes was bought for $825,000. Since then they have sold for $1,035,000 in 2005; $1.3 million also in 2005; and $1.9 million in 2007. At a January 7, 2016, auction held by Heritage Auctions during the Florida United Numismatists show, the finest known example, graded Proof 66 by Professional Coin Grading Service with a green Certified Acceptance Corporation sticker, sold for $1,997,500. In August 2019, another coin was sold at a Stack's Bowers Galleries auction in Chicago, Illinois, for $1,320,000. The buyer was Dell Loy Hansen, then the owner of Major League Soccer team Real Salt Lake.
