= Barber coinage =

American coins

Barber dime
- Value: 10 cents (0.10 US dollars)
- Mass: 2.500 g
- Diameter: 17.91 mm (0.705 in)
- Edge: reeded
- Composition: 90% silver; 10% copper
- Silver: 0.07234 troy oz
- Years of minting: 1891 (patterns only); 1892–1916 (regular issues)
- Mint marks: D, O, S. Located on reverse beneath wreath. Philadelphia Mint specimens lack mint mark.

Obverse
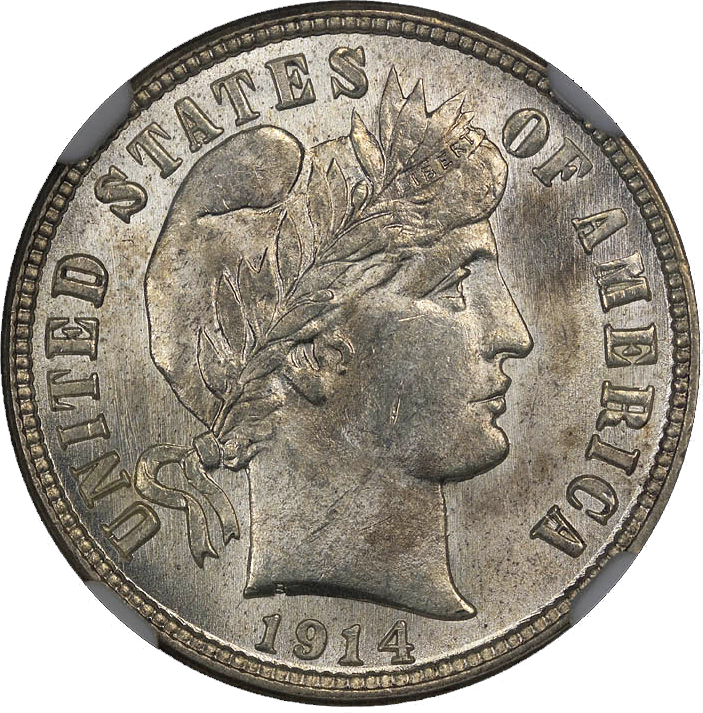
- Design: Head of Liberty
- Designer: Charles E. Barber
- Design date: 1891

Reverse
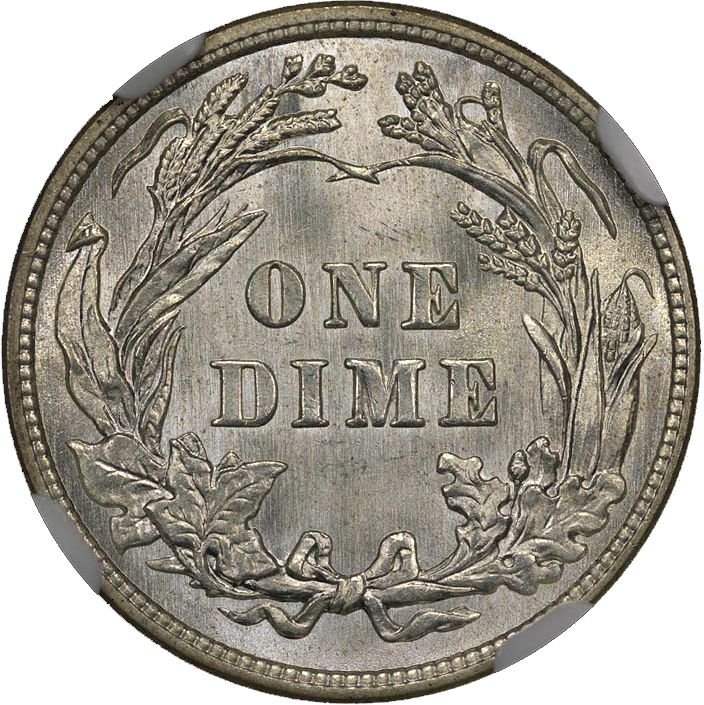
- Design: Denomination within wreath
- Designer: Charles E. Barber
- Design date: 1891

Barber quarter
- Value: 25 cents (.25 US dollars)
- Mass: 6.25 g
- Diameter: 24.3 mm
- Edge: reeded
- Composition: 90 % silver; 10 % copper
- Silver: .18084 troy oz
- Years of minting: 1891 (patterns only); 1892–1916 (regular issues)
- Mint marks: D, O, S. Located on reverse beneath eagle. Philadelphia Mint specimens lack mint mark.

Obverse
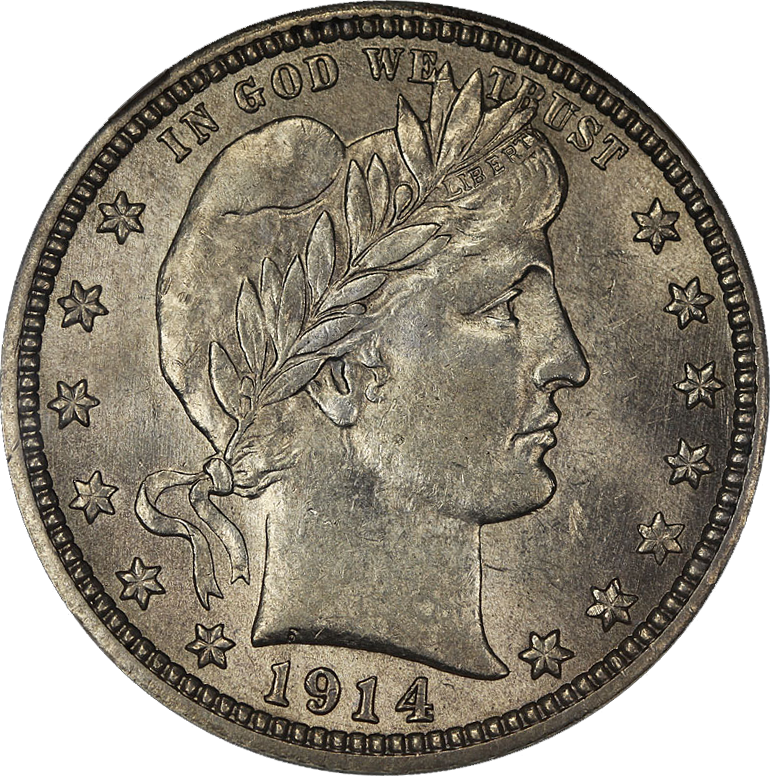
- Design: Head of Liberty
- Designer: Charles E. Barber
- Design date: 1891

Reverse
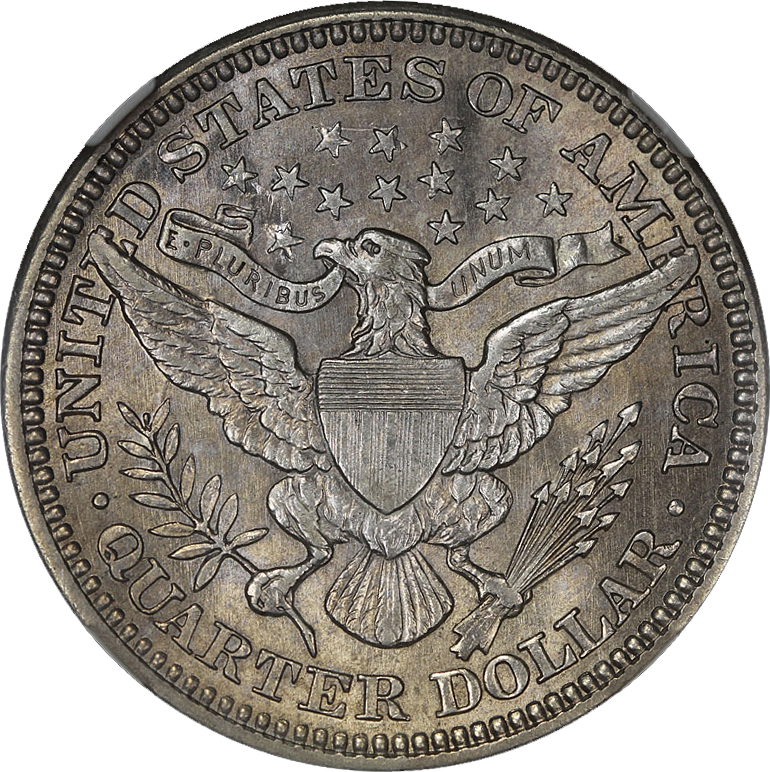
- Design: A heraldic eagle, based on the Great Seal of the United States
- Designer: Charles E. Barber
- Design date: 1891

The Barber coinage consists of a dime, quarter, and half dollar designed by United States Bureau of the Mint Chief Engraver Charles E. Barber. They were minted between 1892 and 1916, though no half dollars were struck in the final year of the series.

By the late 1880s, there were increasing calls for the replacement of the Seated Liberty design, used since the 1830s on most denominations of silver coins. In 1891, Mint Director Edward O. Leech, having been authorized by Congress to approve coin redesigns, ordered a competition, seeking a new look for the silver coins. As only the winner would receive a cash prize, invited artists refused to participate and no entry from the public proved suitable. Leech instructed Barber to prepare new designs for the dime, quarter, and half dollar, and after the chief engraver made changes to secure Leech's endorsement, they were approved by President Benjamin Harrison in November 1891. Striking of the new coins began the following January.

Public and artistic opinion of the new pieces was, and remains, mixed. In 1915, Mint officials began plans to replace them once the design's minimum term expired in 1916. The Mint issued Barber dimes and quarters in 1916 to meet commercial demand, but before the end of the year, the Mercury dime, Standing Liberty quarter, and Walking Liberty half dollar had begun production. Most dates in the Barber coin series are not difficult to obtain, but the 1894 dime struck at the San Francisco Mint (1894-S), with a mintage of 24, is a great rarity.

== Background ==
=== Charles Barber ===
Charles E. Barber was born in London in 1840. His grandfather, John Barber, led the family to America in the early 1850s. Both John and his son William were engravers and Charles followed in their footsteps. The Barber family initially lived in Boston upon their arrival to the United States, though they later moved to Providence to allow William to work for the Gorham Manufacturing Company. William Barber's skills came to the attention of Mint Chief Engraver James B. Longacre, who hired him as an assistant engraver in 1865; when Longacre died in 1869, William Barber became chief engraver and Charles was hired as an assistant engraver.

William Barber died on August 31, 1879, of an illness contracted after swimming at Atlantic City, New Jersey. His son applied for the position of chief engraver, as did George T. Morgan, another British-born engraver hired by the Mint. In early December 1879, Treasury Secretary John Sherman, Mint Director Horatio Burchard, and Philadelphia Mint Superintendent A. Loudon Snowden met to determine the issue. They decided to recommend the appointment of Barber, who was subsequently nominated by President Rutherford B. Hayes and in February 1880, was confirmed by the Senate. Barber would serve nine presidents in the position, remaining until his death in 1917, when Morgan would succeed him.

Coinage redesign was being considered during Barber's early years as chief engraver. Superintendent Snowden believed that the base-metal coins then being struck (the one-, three-, and five-cent pieces) should have uniform designs, as did many of the silver pieces, and also some gold coins. He had Barber create experimental pattern coins. In spite of Snowden's desires, the only design modified was that of the five-cent coin, or nickel; Barber's design, known as the Liberty Head nickel, entered production in 1883. The new coin had its denomination designated by a Roman numeral "V" on the reverse; the three-cent coin had always had a "III" to designate its denomination. Enterprising fraudsters soon realized that the nickel and half eagle (or five-dollar gold piece) were close in size, and plated the base metal coins to pass to the unwary. Amid public ridicule of the Mint, production came to a halt until Barber hastily added the word "cents" to the reverse of his design.

=== Movement towards redesign ===
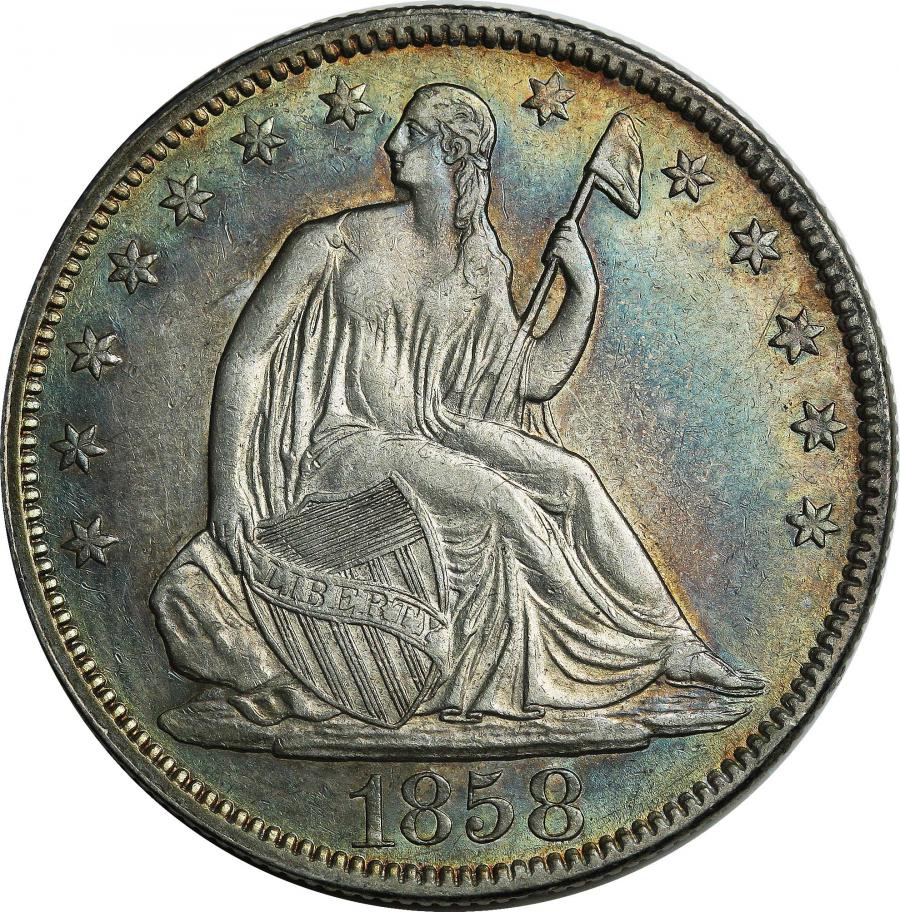
An 1858 Seated Liberty half dollar

For much of the second half of the 19th century, most U.S. silver coins bore a design of a seated Liberty. This design had been created by Christian Gobrecht, an engraver at the United States Mint in Philadelphia, after a sketch by artist Thomas Sully, and introduced to U.S. coins in the late 1830s. The design reflected an English influence, and as artistic tastes changed over time, was increasingly disliked in the United States. In 1876, The Galaxy magazine said of the then current silver coins:

Why is it we have the ugliest money of all civilized nations? The design is poor, commonplace, tasteless, characterless, and the execution is like thereunto. They have rather the appearance of tokens or mean medals. One reason for this is that the design is so inartistic, and so insignificant. That young woman sitting on nothing in particular, wearing nothing to speak of, looking over her shoulder at nothing imaginable, and bearing in her left hand something that looks like a broomstick with a woolen nightcap on it—what is she doing there?

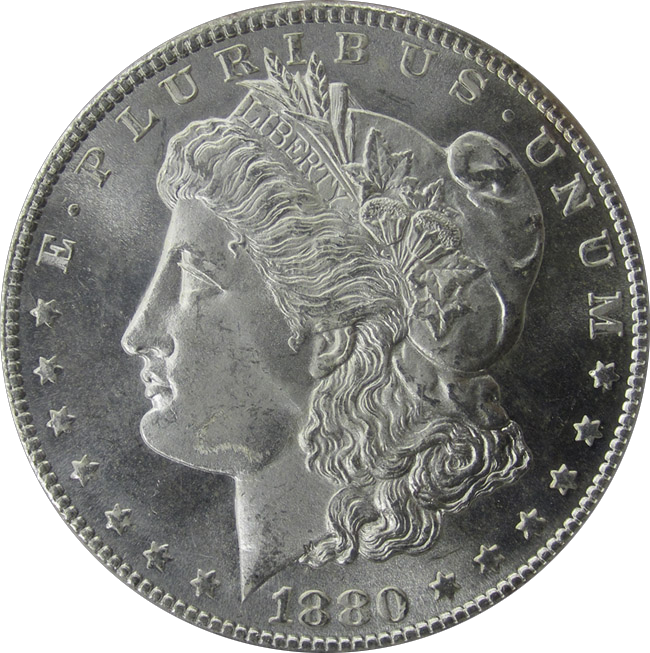
Morgan dollar

Barber half dollar
- Value: 50 cents (0.50 US dollars)
- Mass: 12.50 g
- Diameter: 30.6 mm
- Thickness: 1.8 mm
- Edge: reeded
- Composition: 90 % silver; 10 % copper
- Silver: 0.36169 troy oz
- Years of minting: 1891 (patterns only); 1892–1915 (regular issues)
- Mint marks: D, O, S. Located on reverse beneath eagle. Philadelphia Mint specimens lack mint mark.

Obverse
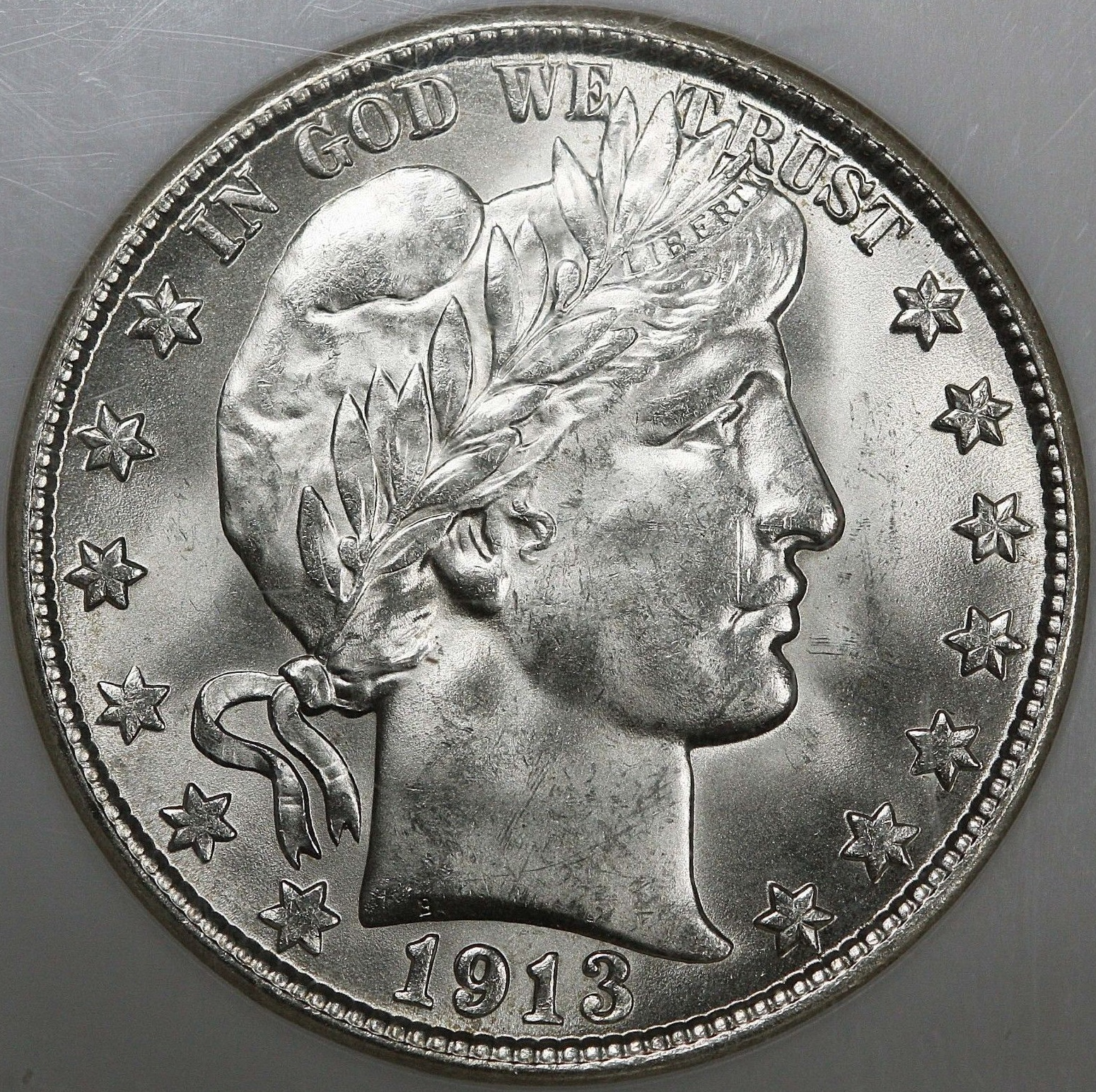
- Design: Head of Liberty
- Designer: Charles E. Barber
- Design date: 1891

Reverse
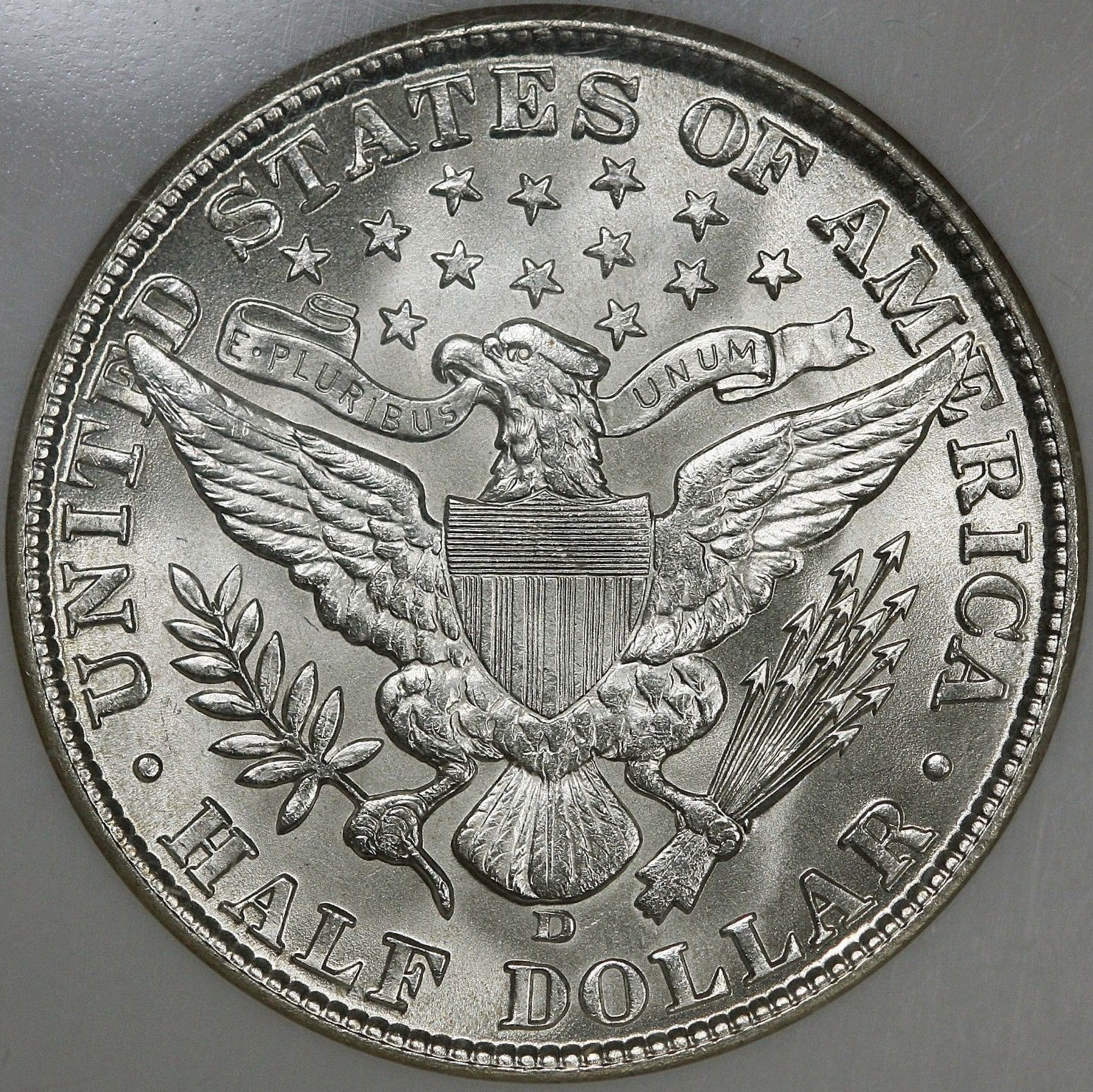
- Design: A heraldic eagle, based on the Great Seal of the United States
- Designer: Charles E. Barber
- Design date: 1891

Public dissatisfaction with the newly-issued Morgan dollar led the Mint's engravers to submit designs for the smaller silver coins in 1879. Among those who called for new coinage was editor Richard Watson Gilder of The Century Illustrated Monthly Magazine. Sometime in the early 1880s, he, along with one of his reporters and sculptor Augustus Saint-Gaudens visited Mint Director Burchard to argue for the creation of new designs. They brought along classic Greek and Roman coins in an attempt to persuade Burchard that the coinage could easily be made more beautiful. The visitors left disappointed, after learning that Burchard considered the much-criticized Morgan dollar as beautiful as any of them.

In 1885, Burchard was succeeded as Mint director by James Kimball. The new director was more receptive to Gilder's ideas and in 1887 announced a competition for new designs for the non-gold coinage. These plans were scuttled when Vermont Senator Justin Morrill questioned the Mint's authority to produce new designs. The Mint had claimed authority under the Coinage Act of 1873 in issuing the Morgan dollar in 1878 and the Liberty Head nickel in 1883. Morrill was a supporter of coin redesign and had in the past introduced bills to accomplish this; he felt, however, that this could not be done without an act of Congress. Kimball submitted the issue to government lawyers; they indicated that the Mint lacked the claimed authority. All three men worked to secure a bill to authorize new designs: Morrill by introducing and pressing legislation, Kimball by lobbying for the authority in his annual report, and Gilder by orchestrating favorable coverage. With legislators busy with other matters, it was not until September 26, 1890, that President Benjamin Harrison signed legislation making all denominations of U.S. coins available for immediate redesign by the Mint upon obtaining the Secretary of the Treasury's approval. Each coin could thereafter be altered from the 25th year after it was first produced; for example, a coin first struck in 1892 would be eligible for redesign in 1916.

== Inception ==
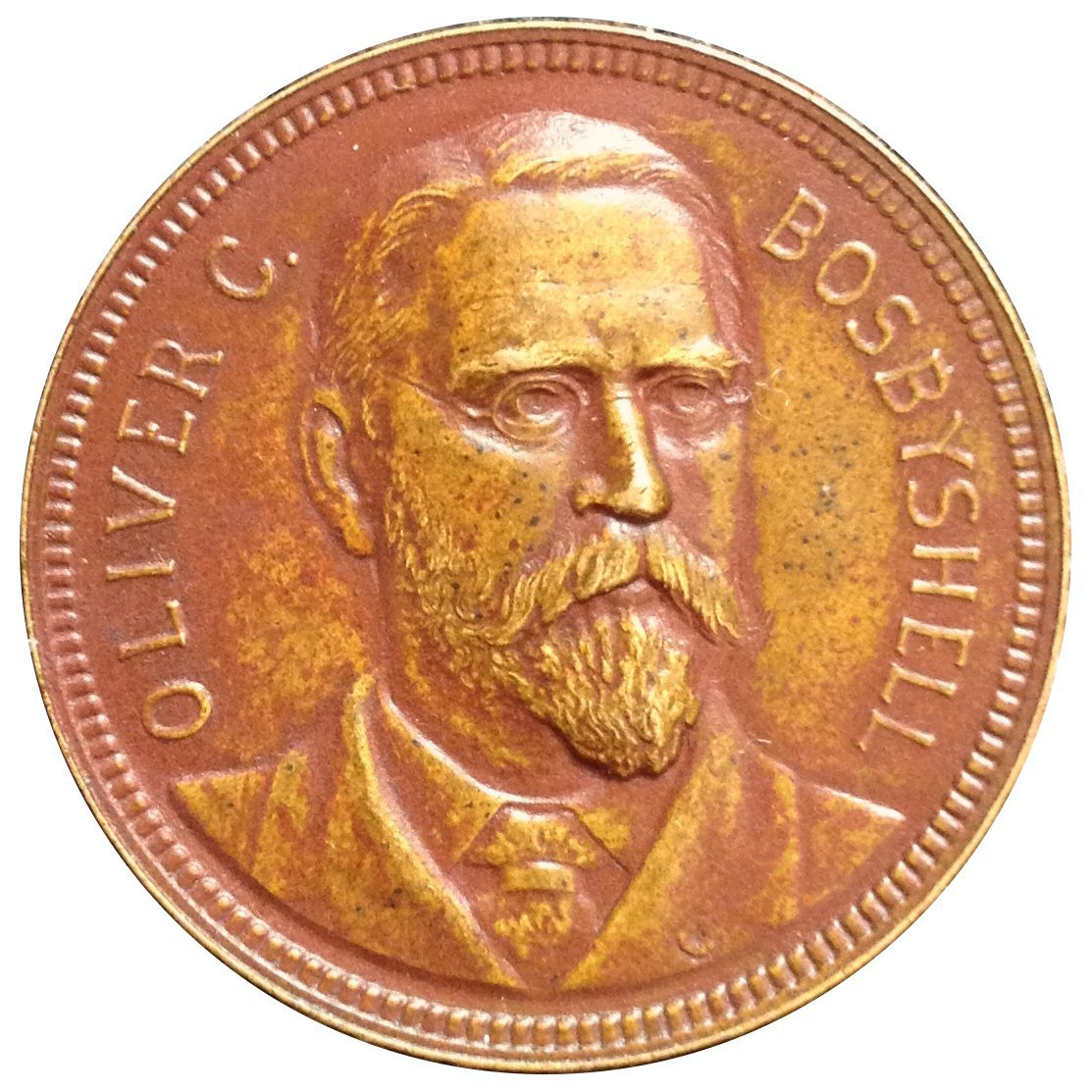
Philadelphia Mint Superintendent Oliver Bosbyshell, Medal by Assistant Engraver George T. Morgan

Three days before the signing of the 1890 act, Barber wrote to the superintendent of the Philadelphia Mint, Oliver Bosbyshell, setting forth proposed terms of a competition to select new coin designs. Barber suggested that entrants be required to submit models, as opposed to drawings, and that the designs be in low relief, which was used for coins. He proposed that the entries include the lettering and denomination, as submissions without them would not adequately show the appearance of the finished coin. He received a reply that due to other work, the Mint would not be able to address the question until the spring of 1891.

On October 16, 1890, a new Mint director, Edward O. Leech, took office. Leech, aged 38 at the time, had spent his career at the Bureau of the Mint, and was an enthusiastic supporter of redesign. He took the precaution of obtaining recommendations from Barber as to suitable outside artists who might participate in a competition. Since most of the proposed artists were New York-based, Andrew Mason, superintendent of the New York Assay Office, was given the task of finalizing the list of invitees. Leading Mason's list of ten names was that of Saint-Gaudens. Mason sent Leech the recommendations on April 3, 1891; the following day, the Mint director announced the competition, open to the public, but he specifically invited the ten artists named by Mason to participate. Besides Saint-Gaudens, artists asked to compete included Daniel Chester French, Herbert Adams and Kenyon Cox. Although Barber had warned the director that reputable artists would likely not enter a contest in which only the winner received compensation, Leech offered a $500 prize to the winner, and no payments to anyone else. He sought new designs for both sides of the dollar, and for the obverses of the half dollar, quarter, and dime—Leech was content to let the reverses of the Seated Liberty coins continue. By law, an eagle had to appear on the quarter and half dollar, but could not appear on the dime.

Most of the artists conferred in New York and responded in a joint letter that they would be willing to participate, but not on the terms set. They proposed a competition with set fees for sketches and designs submitted by the invited artists, to be judged by a jury of their peers, and with the Mint committed to replace the Seated Liberty coins with the result. They also insisted that the same artist create both sides of a given coin, and that more time be given to allow the development of designs. Leech was unable to meet these terms, as there was only enough money available for the single prize. In addition to inviting the ten artists, he had sent thousands of solicitations through the country; a number of designs were submitted in response to the circulars. To judge the submissions, he appointed a jury consisting of Saint-Gaudens, Barber, and Henry Mitchell, a Boston seal engraver and member of the 1890 Assay Commission. The committee met in June 1891 and quickly rejected all entries.

Leech was quoted in the press regarding the result of the contest:

It is not likely that another competition will ever be tried for the production of designs for United States coins. The one just ended was too wretched a failure ... The result is not very flattering to the boasted artistic development of this country, inasmuch as only two of the three hundred suggestions submitted were good enough to receive honorable mention.

Barber wrote years later about the competition, "many [entries] were sent in, but Mr. St. Gaudens, [sic] who was appointed one of the committee to pass upon designs, objected to everything submitted". Numismatic historian Roger Burdette explained the artistic differences between the two men:

It is likely they were so far apart in their artistic understanding that neither listened to what the other had to say ... Barber was from the English trades-apprentice approach where engraving and die sinking were crafts closely aligned to other metal workers such as machine tool makers. His father and grandfather were both engravers. Saint-Gaudens was a classically trained sculptor who began his career as an apprentice cameo cutter in New York, later moving to Paris and Rome for extensive training while perfecting his artistry. Barber generally worked in small, circular formats—a three-inch medal was a large size for his sculptures. Saint-Gaudens was uncomfortable with small medals and typically designed life-size or larger figures ... the 1891 competition turned the two against each other for the rest of their lives.

== Preparation ==
Frustrated at the competition's outcome, Leech instructed Barber on June 11, 1891, to prepare designs for the half dollar, quarter, and dime. As the Morgan dollar was then being heavily struck, the Mint director decided to leave that design unaltered for the time being. For the obverse of the new coins, Leech suggested a depiction of Liberty similar to that on the French coins of the period; he was content that the current reverses be continued. Leech had previously suggested to Barber that he engage outside help if the work was to be done at the Mint; the chief engraver replied that he was aware of no one who could be of help in the preparation of new designs. Leech had spoken with Saint-Gaudens on the same subject; the sculptor stated that only four men in the world were capable of executing high-quality coin designs; three lived in France and he was the fourth.

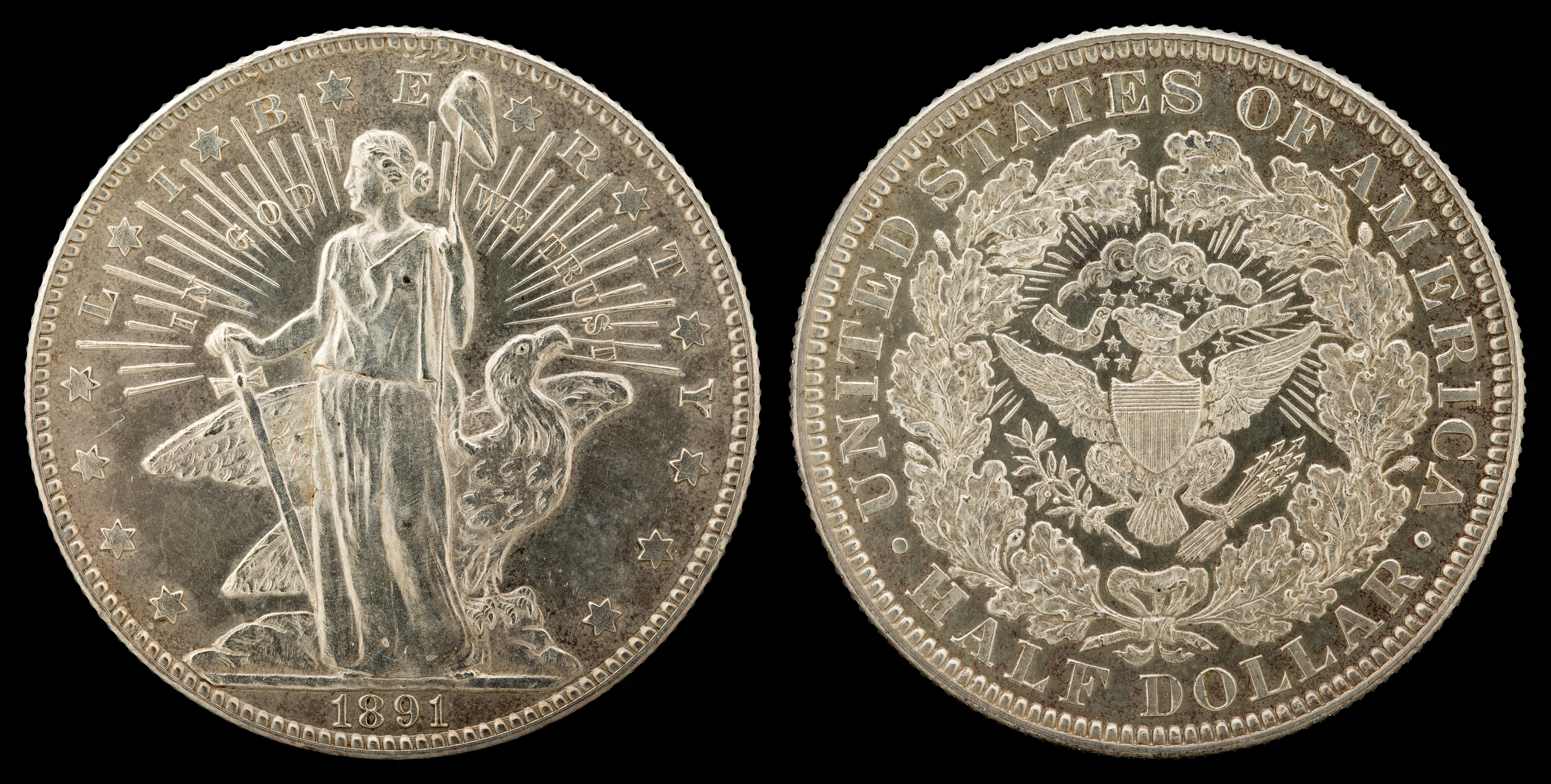
Barber's first obverse for the half dollar

Leech announced the decision to have Barber do the work in July, stating that he had instructed the engraver to prepare designs for presentation to Secretary of the Treasury Charles Foster. In a letter printed in the New York Tribune, Gilder expressed disappointment that the Mint was planning to generate the new designs in-house, feeling that the Mint, essentially a factory for coins, was ill-equipped to generate artistic coin designs. Due to Gilder's prominence in the coinage redesign movement, Leech felt the need to respond personally, which he did in early August. He told Gilder that "artistic designs for coins, that would meet the ideas of an art critic like yourself, and artists generally, are not always adapted for practical coining". He assured Gilder that the designs which Barber had already prepared had met with the approval of Mitchell, though Leech himself had some improvements to suggest to the chief engraver.

Barber's first attempt, modeled for the half dollar, disregarded Leech's instructions. Instead of a design based on French coinage, it depicted a standing figure of Columbia, bearing a pileus (a crown fashioned from an olive branch) atop a liberty pole; an eagle spreading its wings stands behind her. The reverse utilized the heraldic eagle from the Great Seal of the United States, enclosed inside a thick oak wreath, with the required legends surrounding the rim. (Note: Barber later reused the design, in combination with a reverse by Morgan, in a proposed double eagle; instead a design by Saint-Gaudens was used.) Leech rejected the design, and Barber submitted a revised obverse in mid-September with a head of Liberty similar to that on the adopted coin. Leech got feedback from friends and from Secretary Foster; on September 28, he wrote Barber that Liberty's lips were "rather voluptuous" and directed him to prepare a reverse without the wreath. Barber did so, and pattern coins based on the revised design were struck. Barber complained, in a letter on October 2 to Superintendent Bosbyshell, but intended for Leech, that the constant demands for changes were wasting his time. Leech replied, stating that he did not care how much effort was expended in order to improve the design, especially since, once issued, they would have to be used for 25 years. Barber's reply was transmitted to Leech on October 6 with a cover letter from Acting Superintendent Mark Cobb (Bosbyshell was traveling) stating that Barber "disclaims any intention to be captious and certainly did not intend to question your prerogative as one of the officers designed by law to pass upon new designs for coinage". The letter from Barber was a lengthy technical explanation for various design elements, and requested further advice from Leech if he had preferences; the overall tone was argumentative. Leech chose not to write again; he addressed one concern, about whether the olive branches in the design were rendered accurately, by visiting the National Botanical Garden, obtaining one, and sending it to Barber.

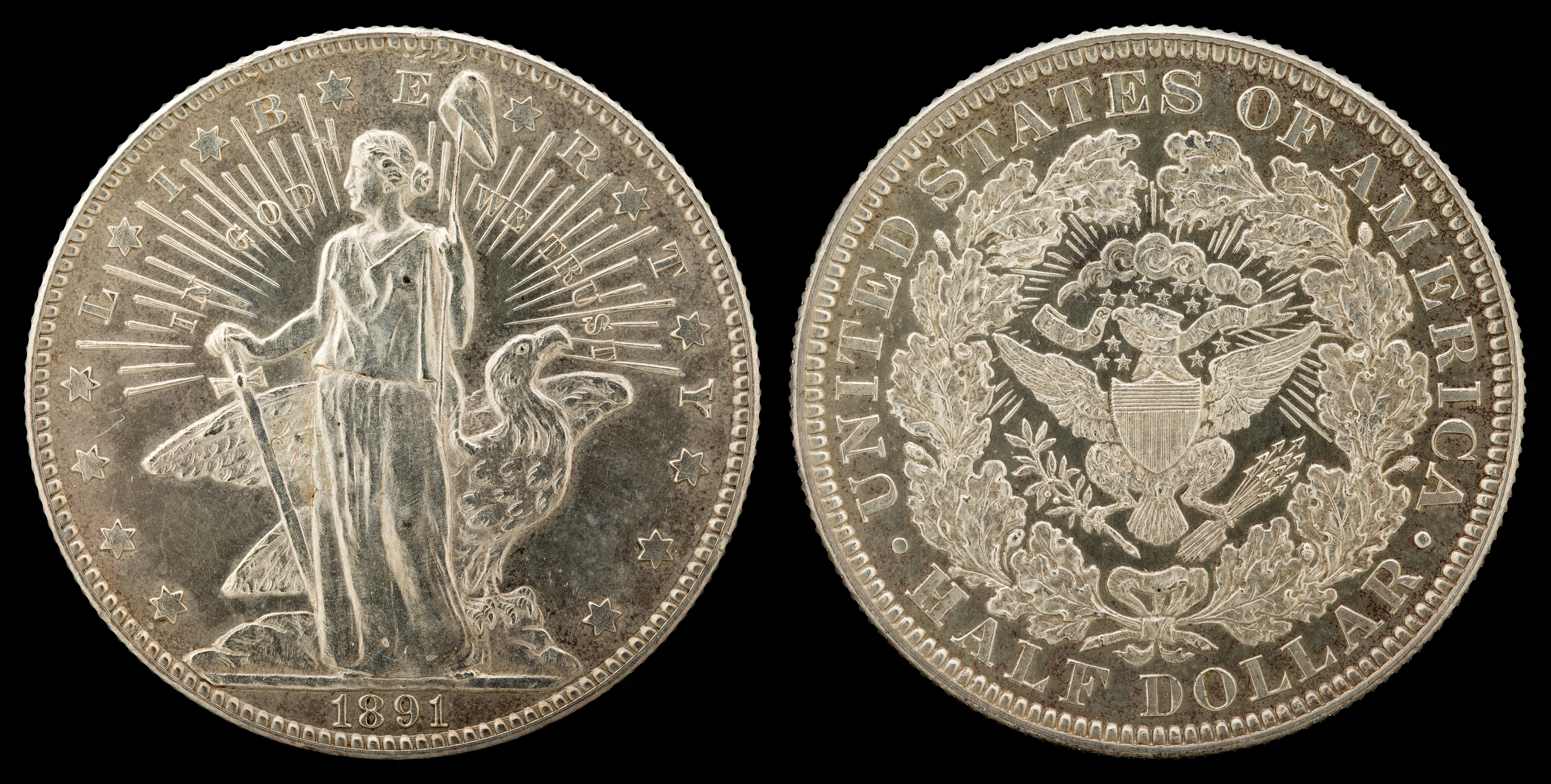
A Barber coinage pattern reverse, with wreaths and clouds

The question of how to render the stars (representing the 13 original states) on the coin was posed in the letters; in the end, Leech opted for six-pointed stars on the obverse and five-pointed ones on the reverse. Barber had prepared three versions of the design, each with clouds over the eagle; Leech approved one on October 31 and ordered working dies prepared, but then began to question the presence of the clouds, and had two more versions made. On November 6, President Harrison and his Cabinet considered which of the designs to approve, and chose one without the clouds; the following day, Leech ordered working dies prepared. Barber scaled down his design for the quarter and dime. While the Cabinet approved the designs, members requested that the Mint embolden the words "Liberty" on the obverse and "E Pluribus Unum" on the reverse, believing that these legends would wear away in circulation; despite the resulting changes, this proved to be accurate. For the reverse of the dime, on which, by law, an eagle could not appear, a slight modification of the reverse of the Seated Liberty dime was used, with a wreath of foliage and produce surrounding the words "One Dime".

It is uncertain when pattern dimes and quarters were struck, but this was most likely in mid-November 1891. One variety each of pattern dime and quarter are known, whereas five different half dollars are extant; all known Barber coin patterns are in the National Numismatic Collection and none are in private hands. On December 11, Bosbyshell requested a delay in production to mid-January 1892 to allow the dies to be more thoroughly tested; Leech refused. The first Barber coins were struck at the Philadelphia Mint on January 2, 1892, at 9:00 a.m. By the end of the day, all three denominations had been coined.

== Design ==
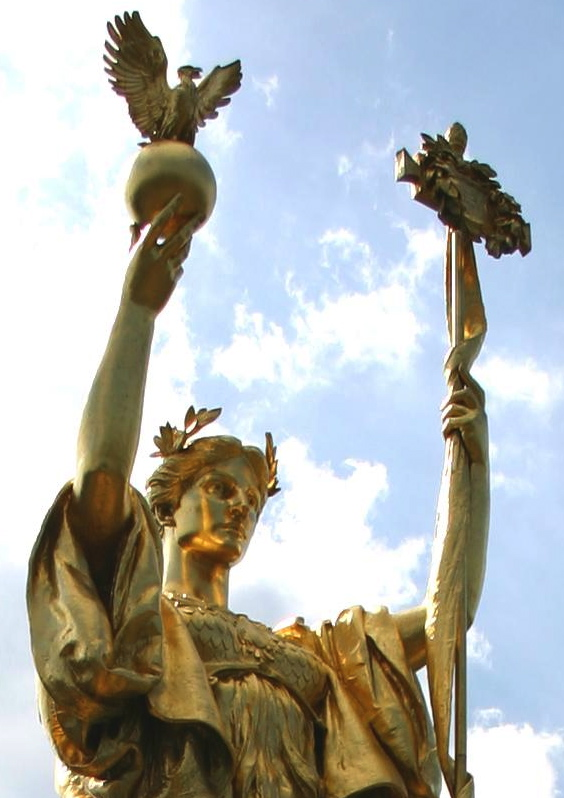
Detail from Daniel Chester French's Republic

All three denominations of the Barber coinage depict a head of Liberty, facing right. She wears a pileus and a small headband inscribed "Liberty". On the quarter and half dollar, the motto "In God We Trust" appears above her head; she is otherwise surrounded with 13 six-pointed stars and the date. On the dime, her head is surrounded with "United States of America" and the year. The reverse of the quarter and the half dollar depicts a heraldic eagle, based on the Great Seal. The bird holds in its mouth a scroll inscribed "E Pluribus Unum" and in its right claws an olive branch; in its left it holds 13 arrows. Above the eagle are 13 five-pointed stars; it is surrounded by the name of the country and by the coin's denomination. The reverse of the dime depicts a wreath of corn, wheat, maple and oak leaves surrounding the words "One Dime". Barber's monogram "B" is on the cutoff of Liberty's neck; the mint mark, on the dime, is placed beneath the wreath on the reverse and beneath the eagle on the larger denominations.

Barber's head of Liberty is purely classical, and is rendered in the Roman style. The head is modeled after the French "Ceres" silver coinage of the late 19th century, but bears a resemblance to Morgan's design for the silver dollar. This did not escape numismatist Walter Breen in his comprehensive guide to U.S. coins: "Barber must have been feeling unusually lazy. He left the [dime] rev[erse] design as it had been since 1860, with minor simplifications. His obv[erse] was a mirror image of the Morgan dollar head, with much of Miss Anna Willess Williams' (Note: The schoolteacher who modeled for the Morgan dollar.) back hair cropped off, the rest concealed ... within a disproportionately large cap." In his text introducing the Barber quarter, Breen states, "the whole composition is Germanically stolid, prosy, crowded (especially on rev[erse]), and without discernible merit aside from the technical one of low relief". Burdette terms Barber's designs, "typically mediocre imitations of the current French-style—hardly better than the arcane seated Liberty type they replaced".

Art historian Cornelius Vermeule, in his work on U.S. coins, took a more positive view of Barber's coinage: "the last word as to their aesthetic merits has yet to be written. Little admired or collected for more than three generations after their appearance [writing in 1971], these essentially conservative but most dignified coins have suddenly become extremely popular with collectors". Vermeule argued that "the designs of Barber's coins were more attuned to the times than he perhaps realized. The plumpish, matronly gravitas of Liberty had come to America seven years earlier in the person of Frédéric Bartholdi's giant statue [the Statue of Liberty] ... " He suggested that the features of Daniel Chester French's huge statue Republic, created for the World Columbian Exposition, "were absolutely in harmony with what Charles Barber had created for the coinage in the year of the Fair's opening".

== Reception ==
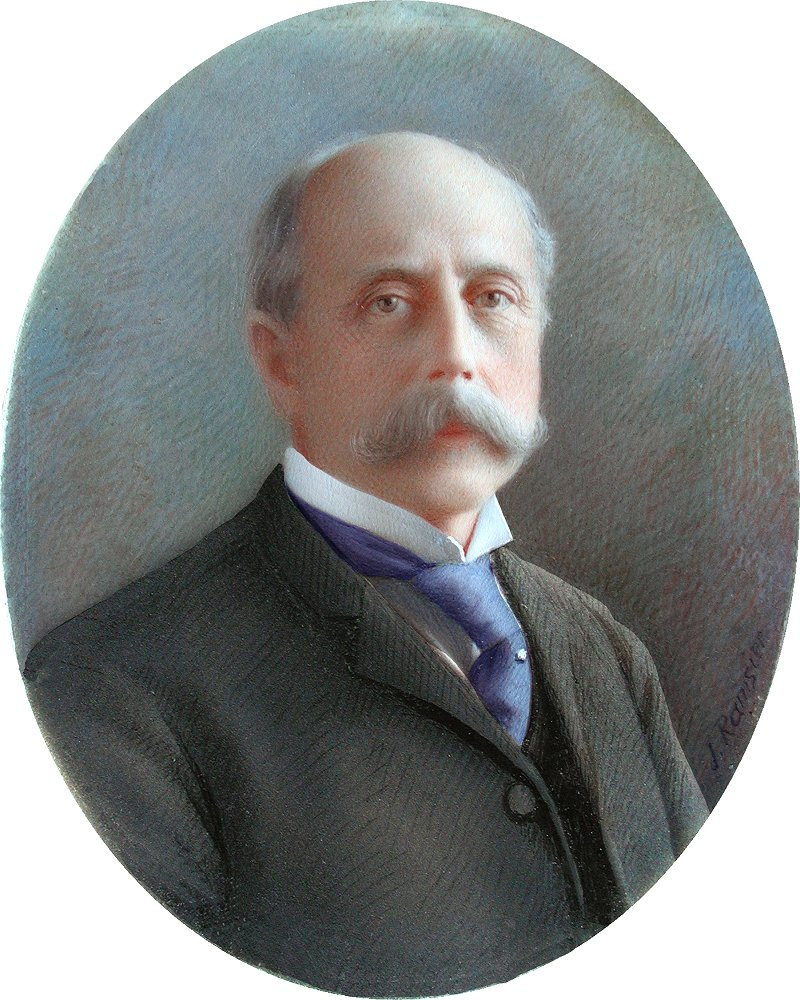
Charles E. Barber. His silver coins met mixed reviews, but were the pocket change of generations

Leech released the new designs to the press about November 10, 1891. According to numismatist David Lange, the new coinage received mixed reviews: "while the general press and public seemed satisfied with the new dime, quarter dollar, and half dollar, numismatists were either mildly disappointed with the new coins or remained silent on the matter." Moran records a number of unfavorable reviews, without listing any favorable ones. Vermeule stated that "the initial comment on the new coinage concerned the novelty of a contest, its failure, and the inevitable result that the commission would go, as always, to the Chief Engraver [Barber] and his staff."

George Heath, editor of The Numismatist, discussed the new pieces: "the mechanical work is all that could be desired, and it is probable that owing to the conventional rut in which our mint authorities seem obliged to keep, this is the best that could be done". W.T.R. Martin wrote in the American Journal of Numismatics, "The general effect is pleasing, of the three the Dime is to many the most attractive piece. The head of Liberty is dignified, but although the silly story has been started that the profile is that of a 'reigning belle' of New York, she can hardly be called a beauty; there is a suggestion ... of the classic heads on some of the Roman coins, and a much stronger suggestion of the head on the French Francs of 1871 and onward ... these coins are an advance on what has hitherto been accomplished, but there is yet a long distance between them and the ideal National coin."

Other reactions were unfavorable. Artist Kenyon Cox, one of the invited artists to the 1891 competition, stated, "I think it disgraceful that this great country should have such a coin as this." Harper's Weekly proclaimed, "The mountain had labored and brought forth a mouse." Saint-Gaudens was also interviewed, and as author Moran put it, "injudiciously ranted": "This is inept; this looks like it had been designed by a young lady of sixteen, a miss who had taken only a few lessons in modeling. It is beneath criticism ... There are hundreds of artists in this country, any of whom, with the aid of a designer, could have made a very respectable coin, which this is not."

== Production and collecting ==
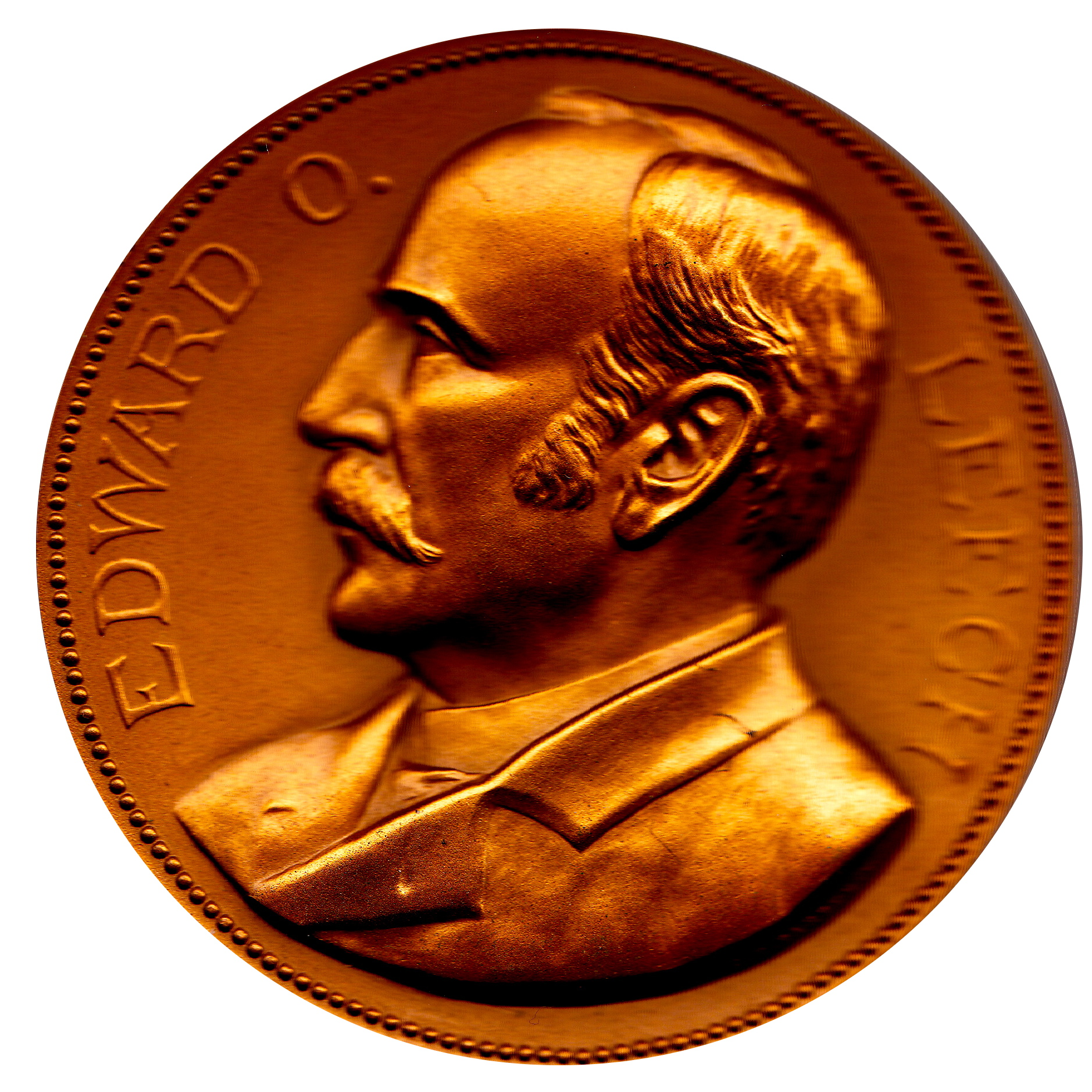
Mint Director Edward O. Leech was a moving force behind the 1892 subsidiary silver coin redesign. Medal by Charles E. Barber.

Soon after issuance of the new quarters, the Mint received complaints that they would not stack properly. Barber made adjustments in his design to remedy this problem. Accordingly, there are two versions of the 1892 quarter, dubbed "Type I" and "Type II", both for the version without mint mark struck at Philadelphia and for those struck at the New Orleans Mint (1892-O) and the San Francisco Mint (1892-S). They may be distinguished by their reverses: Type I quarters have about half of the letter "E" in "UNITED" covered by the eagle's wing; with Type II quarters, the letter is almost entirely obscured. Type I quarters are rarer for each mint.

The 1894-S Barber dime is one of the great numismatic rarities, with a published mintage of 24 proof pieces. Various stories attend the question of how so few came to be coined. According to Nancy Oliver and Richard Kelly in their 2011 article for The Numismatist, the San Francisco Mint in June 1894 needed to coin $2.40 in silver left over from the melting of worn-out coins, just enough to coin 24 dimes. More ten-cent pieces were expected to be struck there later in the year, but this did not occur. Breen, on the other hand, related that San Francisco Mint Superintendent John Daggett had the dimes struck for a group of banker friends, giving three to each. He also gave three to his young daughter Hallie, telling her to retain them until she was as old as he was, and she would be able to sell them for a good price. According to the story, she spent one on a dish of ice cream, but kept the other two until 1954. One of the approximately nine known dimes was retrieved from circulation in 1957, and Breen speculated this may have been the ice cream specimen. One sold for $1,552,500 at auction in 2007.

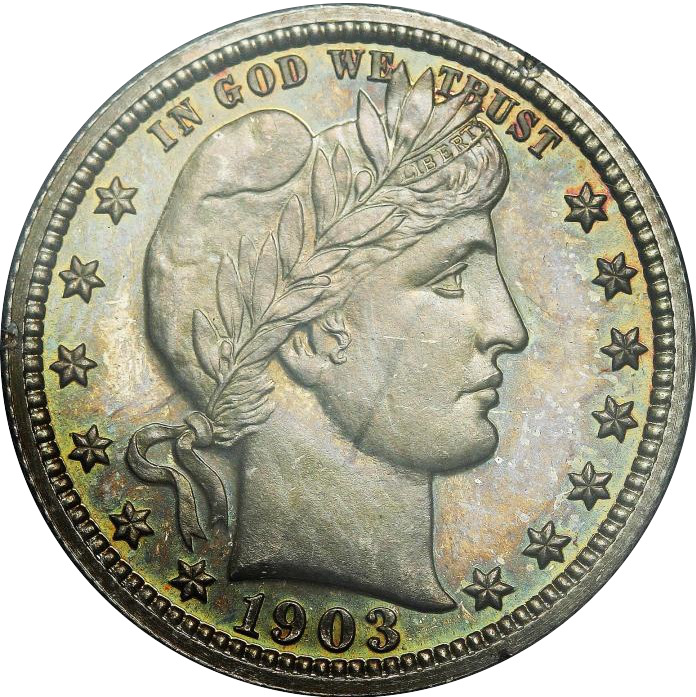
1903 proof condition Barber quarter

In 1900, Barber modified the dies. This change resulted in quarters that were thinner, so that 21 of the new coins would stack in the space occupied by 20 of the old. Barber again set to work on the dies. San Francisco Mint officials wanted permission to use the old dies, which was refused, as it was felt that all mints should be producing coins with the same specifications. There are small differences between quarters produced at the different mints.

Except for the 1894-S dime, there are no great rarities in the Barber series, as mintages were generally adequate to high. Key dates for the dime include the 1895-O (with the lowest mintage), 1896-S, 1897-O, 1901-S and 1903-S. For the quarter, key dates are the very low mintage 1896-S, 1901-S, and 1913-S issues, with the 1901-S particularly scarce. The rarest half dollar is the 1892-O "Micro O", in which the mint mark "O" for New Orleans was impressed on the half dollar die with a puncheon intended for the quarter; other key dates are the regular 1892-O, 1892-S, 1893-S, 1897-O, 1897-S, 1913, 1914, and 1915. The last three dates have very low mintages but were preserved in substantial numbers. As half dollars were heavily circulated, prices tend to steeply rise for all coins in higher grades. "Condition rarities", relatively common and inexpensive in circulated condition but costly in high grades, include the 1901-S, 1904-S, and 1907-S half dollars. Thus, although most dates are easily obtainable, many are scarce in higher and uncirculated grades. Also, in 1909, a new half dollar hub was introduced, which made the headband word "Liberty" stronger, thus changing a grading diagnostic. Earlier Barber halves are frequently separately graded for their obverse and reverse characteristics, as the reverse tended to wear faster. Finally, large quantities of lower grade Barber coins were melted for bullion when silver prices rose in 1979 and early 1980.

In 1989, a group of collectors founded the Barber Coin Collectors Society, a nonprofit organization "dedicated to furthering the knowledge of coins designed" by Charles E. Barber and William Barber. The organization publishes a quarterly journal, and holds an annual meeting in conjunction with the American Numismatic Association World's Fair of Money.

== Replacement ==
According to Burdette, "agitation to replace Barber's banal 1892 Liberty head began almost before the first coins were cold from the press." In 1894, the American Numismatic and Antiquarian Society, in conjunction with various artistic and educational institutes, began to advocate for better designs for U.S. coins, but no change took place in the remainder of the 19th century.

In 1904, President Theodore Roosevelt started to push for improvements to U.S. coins, and arranged for the Mint to engage Saint-Gaudens to redesign coins which could be changed under the 1890 act. Before his death in 1907, the sculptor provided designs for the double eagle and eagle, though the double eagle required adjustment by Barber to lower the relief before it could be released as a circulating coin. Redesign of the smaller gold pieces, Lincoln cent, and Buffalo nickel followed between 1908 and 1913. By then, the dime, quarter, and half dollar were the only coins being struck (Note: The Morgan dollar had not then been struck since 1904.) which had not received a redesign in the 20th century. As the 1916 date approached when the Barber coins could be changed without an act of Congress, calls for a new design increased.

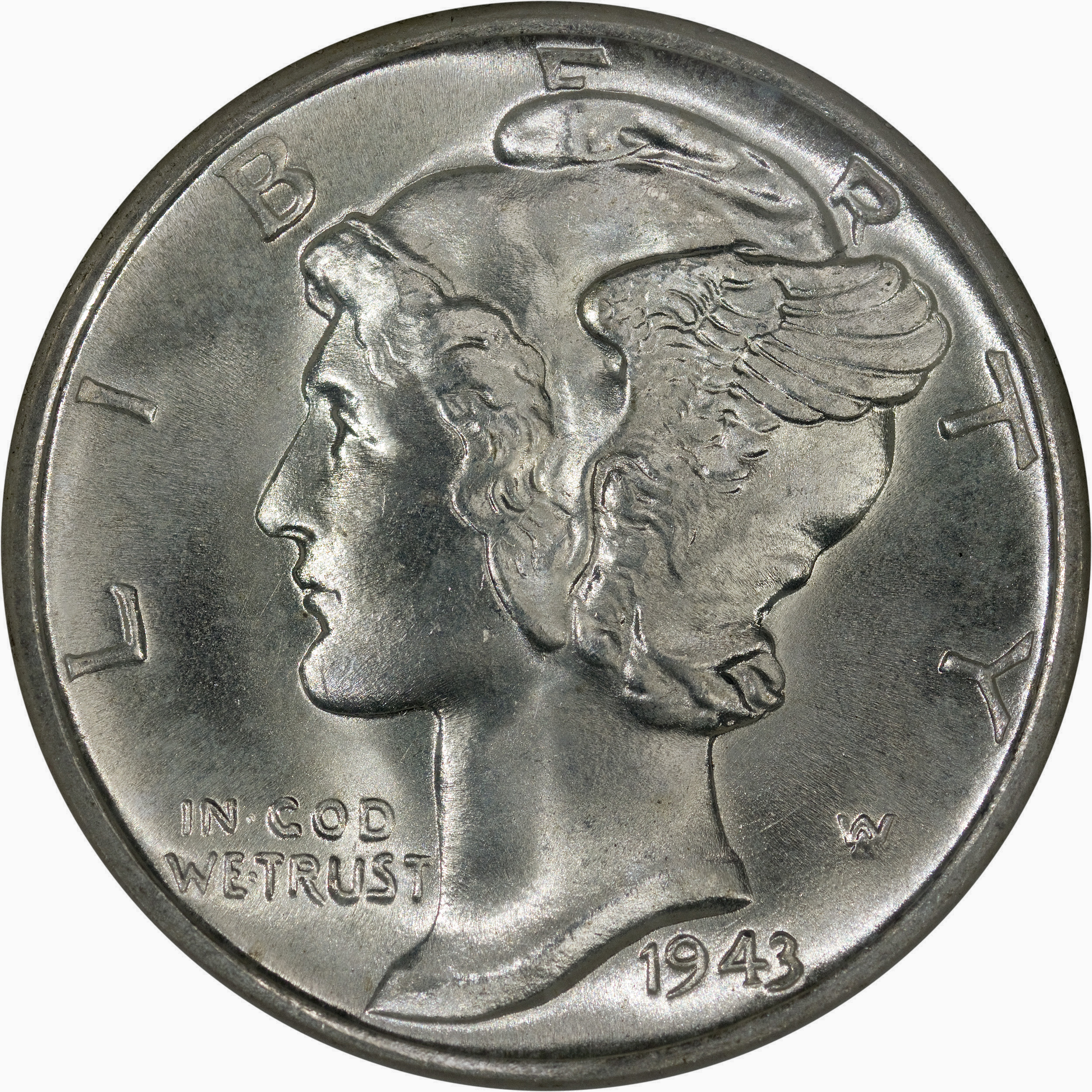
Adolph Weinman's Winged Liberty Head "Mercury" dime

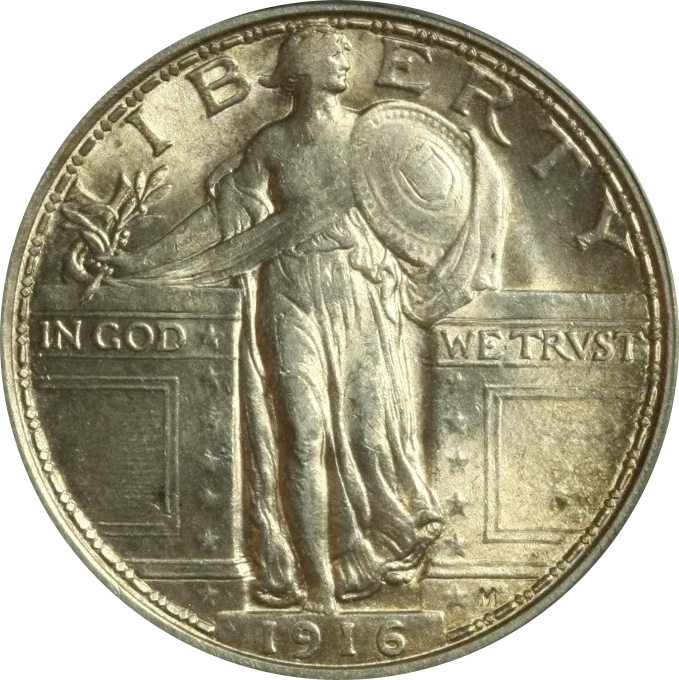
Hermon MacNeil's Standing Liberty quarter

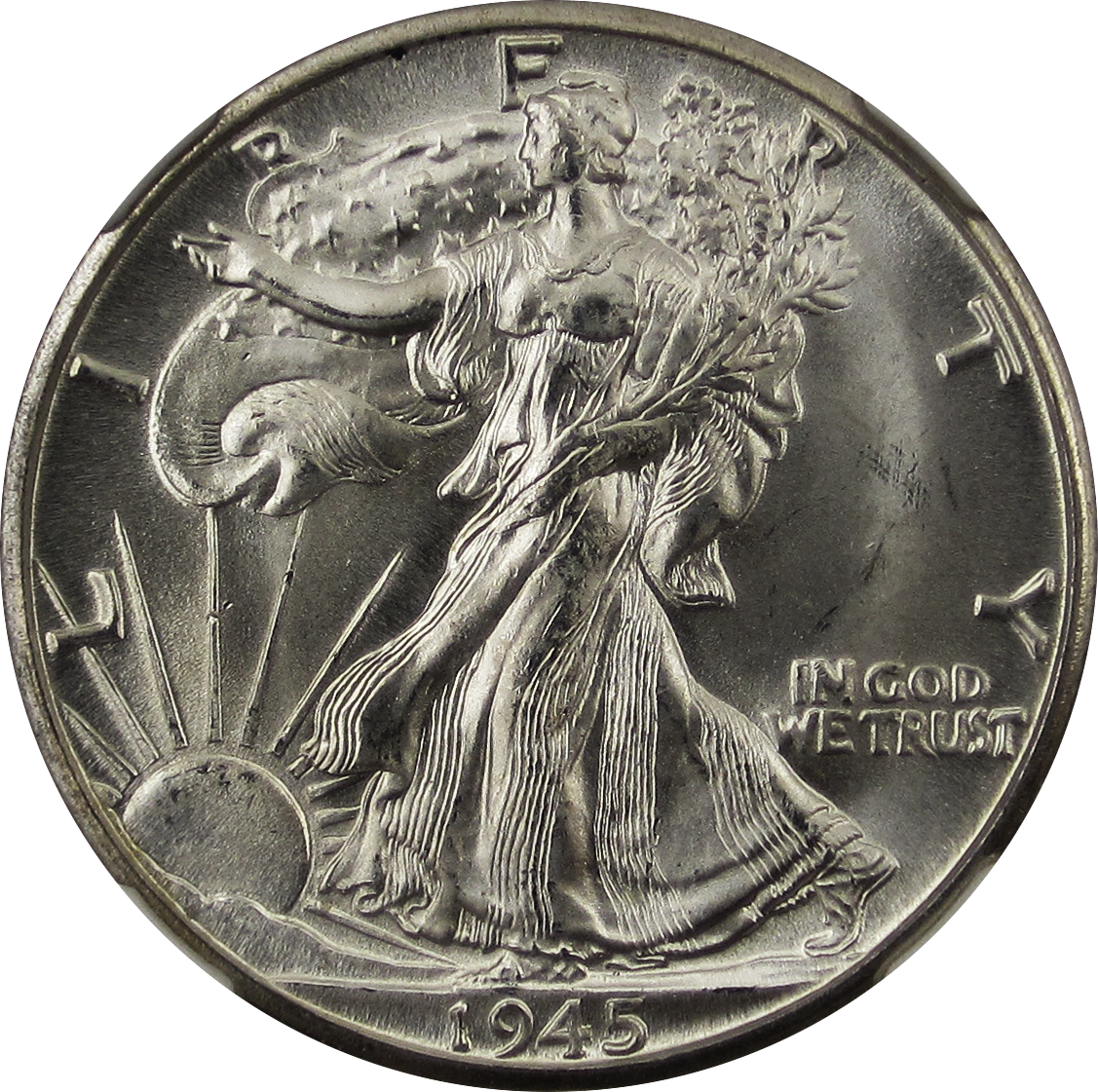
Adolph Weinman's Walking Liberty half dollar

In 1915, a new Mint director, Robert W. Woolley, took office. Woolley advocated the replacement of the silver coins when it was legal to do so, and instructed Barber and Morgan to prepare new designs. He consulted with the Commission of Fine Arts, asking them to examine the designs produced by the Mint's engravers and, if they felt they were not suitable, to recommend artists to design the new coins. The Commission rejected the Barber and Morgan designs and proposed Adolph Weinman, Hermon MacNeil, and Albin Polasek as designers. Although Woolley had hoped that each artist would produce one design, different concepts by Weinman were accepted for the dime and half dollar, and one by MacNeil for the quarter.

Woolley had hoped to begin production of the new coins on July 1, 1916. There was heavy demand for small change, and as delays in actual production stretched into the second half of the year, Woolley was forced to have Barber prepare dies for 1916-dated dimes and quarters bearing the chief engraver's 1892 design. According to numismatist David Lange, "Barber must have secretly smiled to himself as his familiar Roman bust of Liberty once again dropped from the presses by the thousands, and then by the millions." There were sufficient half dollars from 1915 available to meet demand; no Barber halves were struck in 1916. The production difficulties were eventually ironed out, and at least token quantities of each of the new coins were struck in 1916, putting an end to the Barber coinage series.

== Notes ==
Preceded by Seated Liberty coinage	United States coinage (1892–1916)	Succeeded by Mercury dime Standing Liberty Quarter; Walking Liberty half dollar
