= Charles E. Barber =

American engraver (1840–1917)

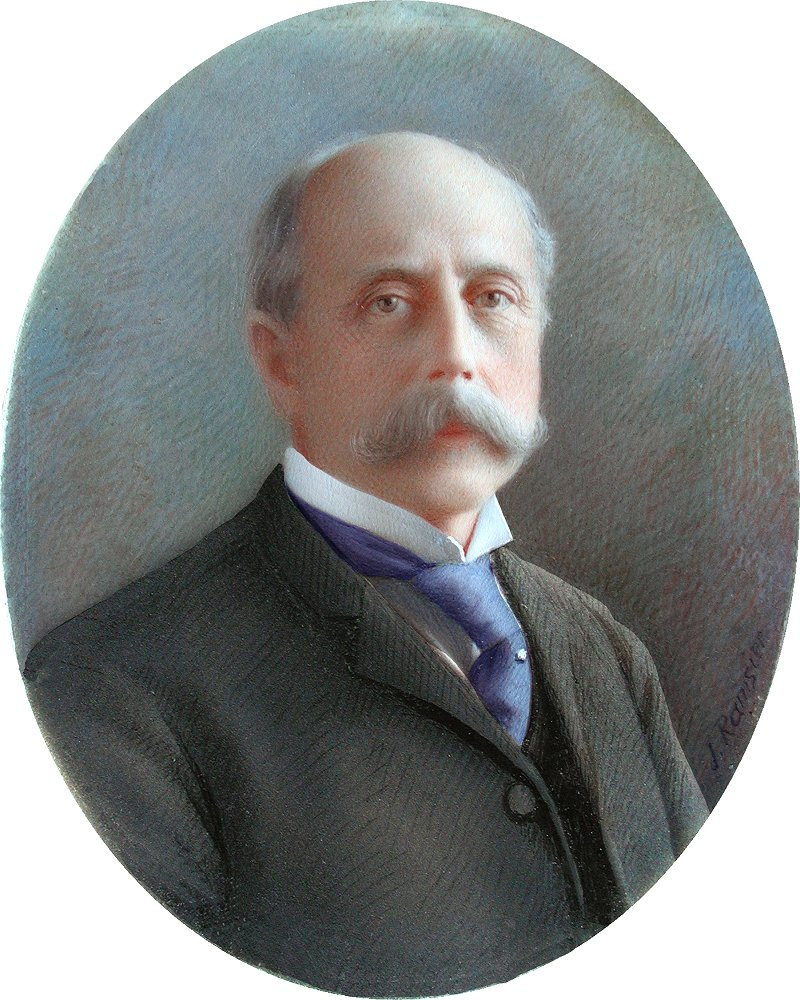

6th Chief Engraver of the U.S. Mint
- In office January 20, 1880 – February 18, 1917
- President: List of presidents: Rutherford B. Hayes; James A. Garfield; Chester A. Arthur; Benjamin Harrison; Grover Cleveland (2nd term); William McKinley; Theodore Roosevelt; William Howard Taft; Woodrow Wilson
- Preceded by: William Barber
- Succeeded by: George T. Morgan

Personal details
- Born: Charles Edward Barber; November 16, 1840 London, England
- Died: February 18, 1917 (aged 76) Philadelphia, Pennsylvania
- Resting place: Mount Peace Cemetery, Philadelphia, Pennsylvania
- Occupation: Engraver

Charles Edward Barber (November 16, 1840 – February 18, 1917) was an American coin engraver who served as the sixth chief engraver of the United States Mint from 1879 until his death in 1917. He had a long and fruitful career in coinage, designing most of the coins produced at the mint during his time as chief engraver. He did full coin designs, and he designed about 30 medals in his lifetime. The Barber coinage were named after him. In addition, Barber designed a number of commemorative coins, some in partnership with assistant engraver George T. Morgan. For the popular Columbian half dollar, and the Panama-Pacific half dollar and quarter eagle, Barber designed the obverse and Morgan the reverse. Barber also designed the 1883 coins for the Kingdom of Hawaii, and also Cuban coinage of 1915. Barber's design on the Cuba 5 centavo coin remained in use until 1961.

At the request of President Roosevelt and Mint director George E. Roberts, Barber made a trip to Europe to visit a number of foreign mints on an information-sharing mission. His goal was to observe and discuss the practices at the foreign mints to look for ways to improve operations and efficiency at the U.S. Mint. He combined this trip with a family vacation with his second wife Caroline and his 19-year-old daughter Edith. Barber carried with him memos from various departments within the mint with questions to ask their counterparts overseas. These memos, some of which today have Barber's hand-written notes, correspond to the various reports he submitted to Mint director Roberts after his return (these reports are in the National Archives). Edith's diary from the trip provide details on their itinerary and personal reflections on her father.

Barber was known to be a meticulous professional. While different people have varying opinions about the artistic merits of his designs, it is indisputable that his coin designs hold up to years of heavy use and wear. This is one reason that so many Barber coins exist in such low grades—they were real workhorses in the U.S. economy and were routinely found in circulation until the 1950s.

== Career ==
Barber was born in London on November 16, 1840, the son of engraver William Barber. In 1869, he was appointed the assistant engraver at the United States Mint in Philadelphia. On January 20, 1880, he was appointed by President Rutherford B. Hayes to succeed his father in the position as chief engraver. He was frequently criticized for unimaginative designs, though R.W. Julian suggests that he "was capable of superb work when given a free hand".

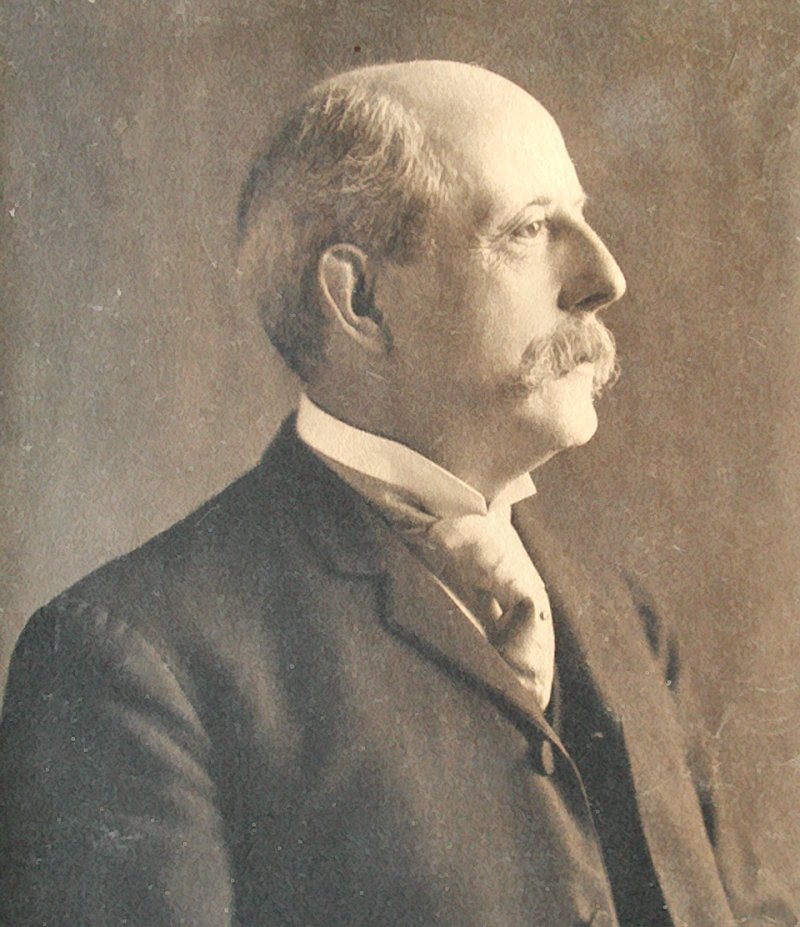
Charles E. Barber, 6th Chief Engraver of the U.S. Mint

Barber's best known designs are the Liberty Head coins — Barber dime, Barber quarter, and Barber half dollar, as well as the so-called "V" Liberty Head nickel. Some lesser known pattern coin designs include the trial copper-nickel cent, trial three-cent piece, and the $4 Stella "Flowing Hair" pieces. He was strongly critical of Augustus St. Gaudens' proposed high relief pattern for a new double eagle in 1907 and tried hard to stop them from being produced, citing the impracticality of the design. For a circulating coin, Saint-Gaudens' high-relief double eagle was considered impractical as each coin required three to five blows of the dies to produce. Barber had to significantly lower the relief of the design to make a production-worthy coin. From 1907 to 1933, over 70 million "Saints" would be struck, impossible with Saint-Gaudens' original design. Barber was succeeded as chief engraver by George T. Morgan.

=== Relationship with Theodore Roosevelt ===
Contrary to wide belief, Barber also had a warm personal relationship with President Theodore Roosevelt. While it is true that Roosevelt wanted U.S. coinage in the new century to have a more modern look, and also solicited designs from artists outside the U.S. Mint, this does not mean that he had a personal dislike of the man. The descendants of Charles Barber possess artifacts that prove a warm personal relationship existed.

=== Relationship with George Morgan ===
While much has been written about Barber being disagreeable and even hostile to Morgan, this has been conclusively disproved, with concrete evidence that the two had a warm personal relationship during their 40 years of closely working together.

== Personal life ==
In 1875, Barber married Martha Jones, who died in 1899. In 1902, he married Caroline Gaston (1846–1950), who was his wife until his death in 1917. Charles and Martha had two daughters, Anna May (1875-1876), named for Charles' mother, and Edith (1886–1970).

== Death ==
Charles E. Barber died on February 18, 1917, and was buried 3 days later with Martha and infant daughter Anna May in Mount Peace Cemetery in Philadelphia. The flags at the Philadelphia Mint were lowered to half staff on the day of his funeral. Roger Burdette provided a scan from the National Archives of the letter from Mint director F. H. von Engelken requesting permission to half-mast the flags. Charles E. Barber is the last mint official of any rank to have had this high honor bestowed upon him.

== Coins designed ==
=== Public issues ===
- Barber half dollar
- Barber quarter
- Barber dime
- Liberty Head nickel

=== Commemoratives ===
- The obverse (front) of the Columbian Exposition half dollar
- Isabella Quarter
- Silver Lafayette Dollar
- Louisiana Purchase Exposition gold dollar
- Lewis and Clark Exposition gold dollar
- The obverse (front) of the Panama-Pacific Exposition half dollar
- The obverse (front) of the Panama-Pacific Exposition quarter eagle
- The obverse (front) of the William McKinley Memorial gold dollar
- Pikes Peak "Southwest Expedition" medal

=== Foreign coins ===
- Kingdom of Hawaii 1883 dime, quarter, half, and dollar
- Szechuan Province of China, 1897
- Cuba 1915-1961 1, 2, 5, 10, 20 & 40 Centavos

=== Notable Pattern coins ===
- Flowing Hair Stella 1879-1880
- "Washlady" silver pattern quarter
- Famous 1891 Liberty Head patterns
- 1896 experimental pieces - cent and five cents

Government offices
Preceded by William Barber	Chief Engraver of the U.S. Mint; 1880–1917	Succeeded by George T. Morgan
