= Liberty dollar =

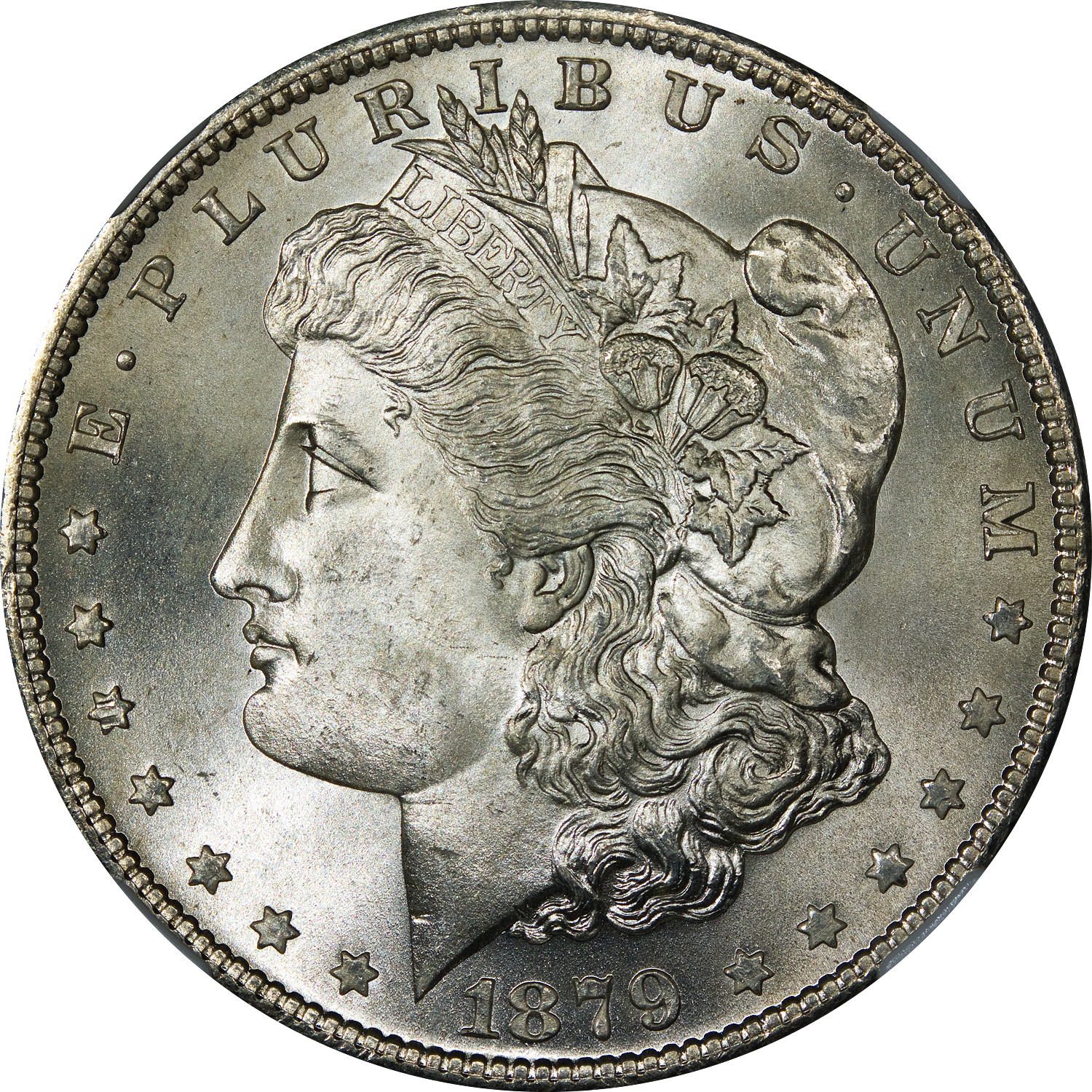
The goddess Liberty is portrayed on the Morgan dollar, designed by George T. Morgan, minted between 1878 and 1904 and again in 1921.

Liberty dollar may refer to:

- Liberty dollar (private currency), a private currency produced in the United States
  - Ron Paul dollar, a 2007 coin minted by the same service, NORFED
- Dollar coin (United States), various dollar coins of the United States, including:
  - Flowing Hair dollar, the first dollar coin issued by the United States federal government, depicting the goddess Liberty and bearing the inscription "Liberty", minted in 1794 and 1795
  - Draped Bust dollar, a United States dollar coin depicting the goddess Liberty and bearing the inscription "Liberty", minted from 1795 to 1803, and later reproduced in very limited quantities during the 1830s to 1850s bearing the date 1804
    - 1804 dollar, an extremely rare dollar coin of the United States depicting the goddess Liberty and bearing the inscription "Liberty", a variant of the Draped Bust dollar, minted in very limited quantities from the 1830s to 1850s
  - Gobrecht dollar, a dollar coin of the United States depicting the goddess Liberty, minted from 1836 to 1839
  - Seated Liberty dollar, a dollar coin of the United States depicting the goddess Liberty, minted from 1840 to 1873
  - Gold dollar, a gold dollar coin of the United States depicting the goddess Liberty, minted from 1849 to 1889
  - Trade dollar (United States coin), a silver trade coin of the United States depicting the goddess Liberty, minted from 1873 to 1885
  - Morgan dollar, a dollar coin of the United States depicting the goddess Liberty, minted from 1878 to 1904, then again in 1921, and issued as a commemorative in 2021
  - Peace dollar, a dollar coin of the United States depicting the goddess Liberty and bearing the inscription "Liberty", minted from 1921 to 1928, again in 1934 and 1935, and issued as a commemorative in 2021
  - American Silver Eagle, a dollar coin of the United States depicting the goddess Liberty and bearing the inscription "Liberty", the official silver bullion coin of the United States, first produced in 1986

== See also ==
- Liberty (goddess)
- United States Seated Liberty coinage, 1836 various denominations
- Barber coinage, 1892 various denominations
- Liberty coins with other face values:
  - Half Eagle, a 1795 coin with a face value of two dollars
  - Coronet large cent, an 1816 coin with a face value of 0.01 dollars
  - Liberty Head double eagle, an 1850 coin with a face value of 20 dollars
  - Liberty Head nickel, an 1883 coin with a face value of 0.05 dollars
  - Standing Liberty quarter, a 1916 coin with a face value of 0.25 dollars
  - Walking Liberty half dollar, a 1916 coin with a face value of 0.5 dollars
