= Liberty Head nickel =

American five-cent piece

Liberty head nickel
- United States
- Value: 5 cents (.05 US dollars)
- Mass: 5.000 g (0.1615 troy oz)
- Diameter: 21.21 mm (0.8350 in)
- Edge: Plain
- Composition: 75% copper; 25% nickel
- Years of minting: 1883–1913
- Mint marks: D, S. 1912 only; adjacent to the dot separating the words "CENTS" and "UNITED". Philadelphia Mint pieces lack mint mark.

Obverse
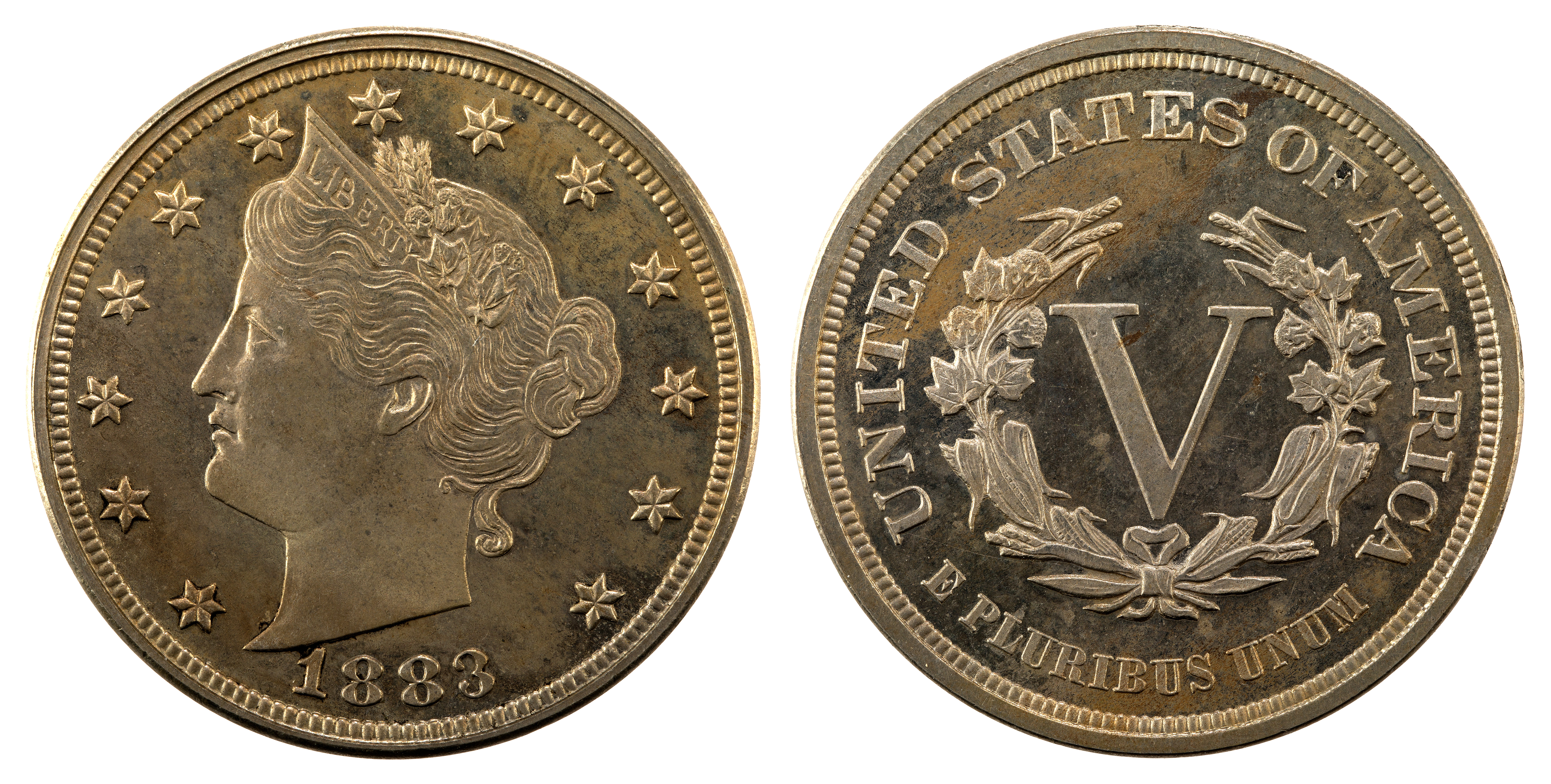
- Design: Liberty, wearing a coronet and wreath
- Designer: Charles Barber
- Design date: 1883
- Design discontinued: 1913

Reverse
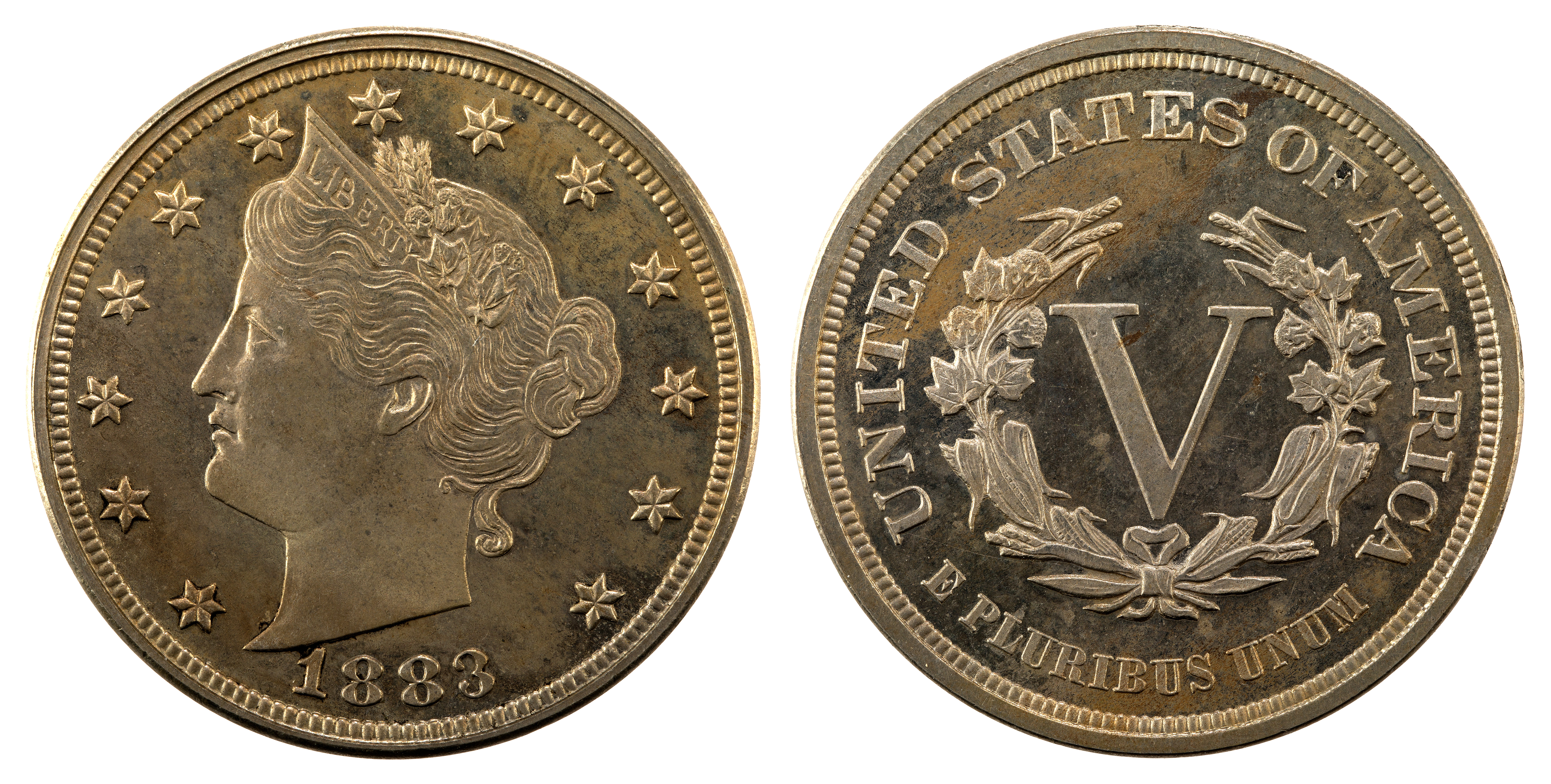
- Design: Roman numeral V, for 5, indicating the denomination, surrounded by a wreath
- Designer: Charles Barber
- Design date: 1883
- Design discontinued: 1883
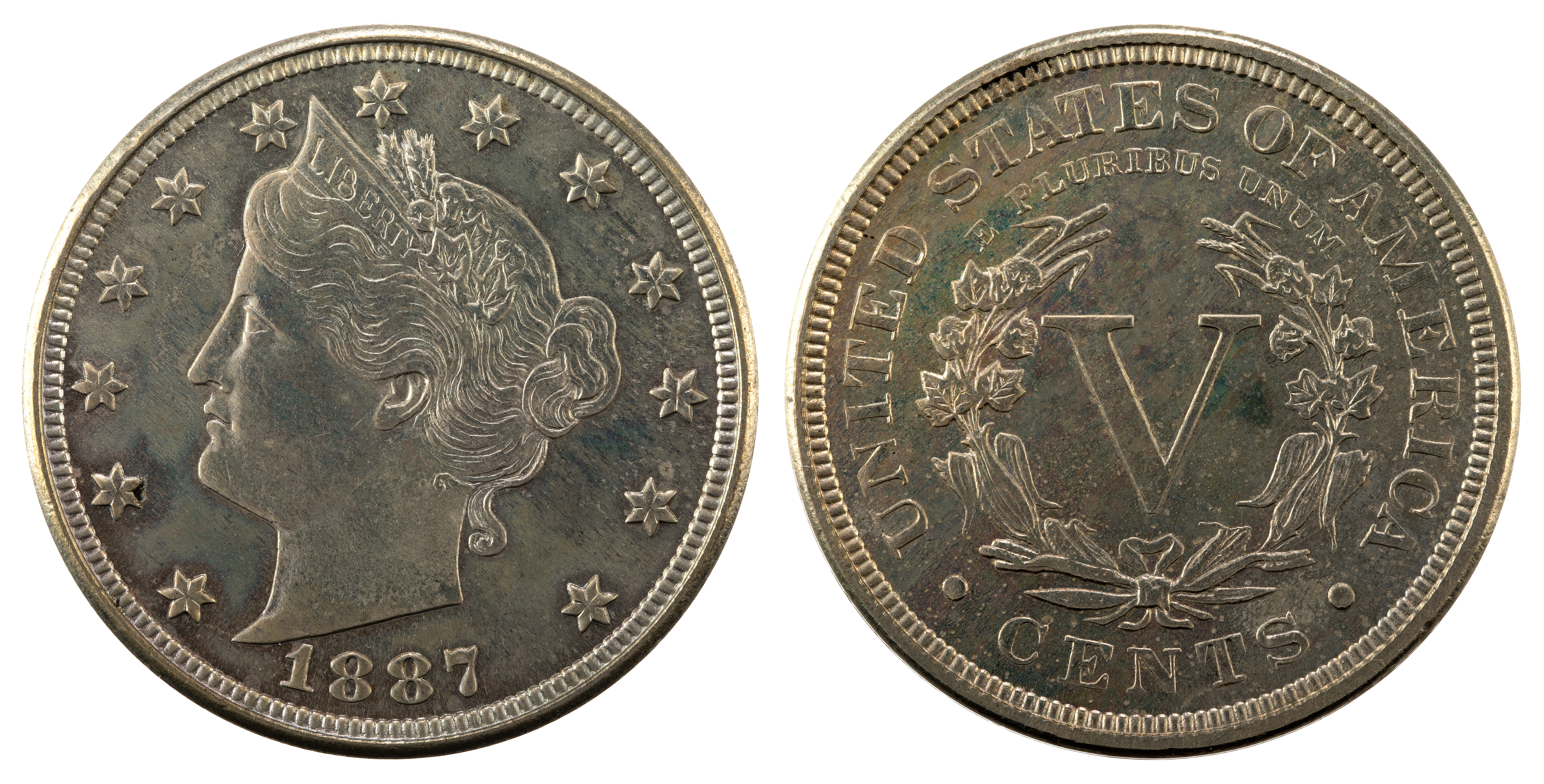
- Designer: Charles Barber
- Design date: 1883
- Design discontinued: 1913

The Liberty Head nickel, sometimes referred to as the V nickel because of its reverse (or tails) design, is an American five-cent piece. It was struck for circulation from 1883 until 1912, with at least five pieces being surreptitiously struck dated 1913. The obverse features a left-facing image of the goddess of Liberty.

The original copper–nickel five-cent piece, the Shield nickel, had longstanding production problems, and in the early 1880s, the United States Mint was looking to replace it. Mint Chief Engraver Charles Barber was instructed to prepare designs for proposed one-, three-, and five-cent pieces, which were to bear similar designs. Only the new five-cent piece was approved, and went into production in 1883. For almost thirty years large quantities of coin of this design were produced to meet commercial demand, especially as coin-operated machines became increasingly popular.

Beginning in 1911, the Mint began work to replace the Liberty head design, and a new design, which became known as the Buffalo nickel, went into production in February 1913. Although no 1913 Liberty head nickels were officially struck, five are known to exist. While it is uncertain how these pieces originated, they have come to be among the most expensive coins in the world, with one selling in 2018 for $4.5 million.

== Origin ==
Industrialist Joseph Wharton, who had interests in nickel mining and production, had been influential in the decision to use the metal in coinage in the mid-1860s, leading to the introduction of the Shield nickel in 1866. The Shield nickel presented difficulties through its life: the intricate design made the coins not strike well. Modification to the design failed to solve the technical problems, and the mint had considered replacing the design as early as 1867. Nevertheless, the Shield nickel remained in production. With production of copper–nickel five-cent pieces lagging in the late 1870s, and with production of copper-nickel three-cent pieces nearly moribund, Wharton sought to increase his sales of nickel to the United States Mint. Although copper-nickel coins were struck only in small numbers, the bronze cent represented a major portion of the Mint's production, and Wharton began to lobby for the piece to be struck in copper-nickel.

In 1881, this lobbying led Mint Superintendent Archibald Loudon Snowden to order Mint Chief Engraver Charles Barber to produce uniform designs for a new cent, three-cent nickel, and five-cent piece. Snowden informed Barber that the proposed designs were to feature on the obverse (or heads side) a classic head of Liberty with the legend "Liberty" and the date. The reverse (or tails side) was to feature a wreath of wheat, cotton, and corn around a Roman numeral designating the denomination of the coin; thus the five-cent piece was to have the Roman numeral "V". The proposal for the cent would decrease its size to 16 millimetres (0.63 in) and its weight to 1.5 grams (0.053 oz), and the modifications to the three-cent piece would increase its size to 19 millimetres (0.75 in) and its weight to 3 grams (0.11 oz). The nickel would retain its weight of 5 grams (0.18 oz), but its diameter would be increased to 22 millimetres (0.87 in).

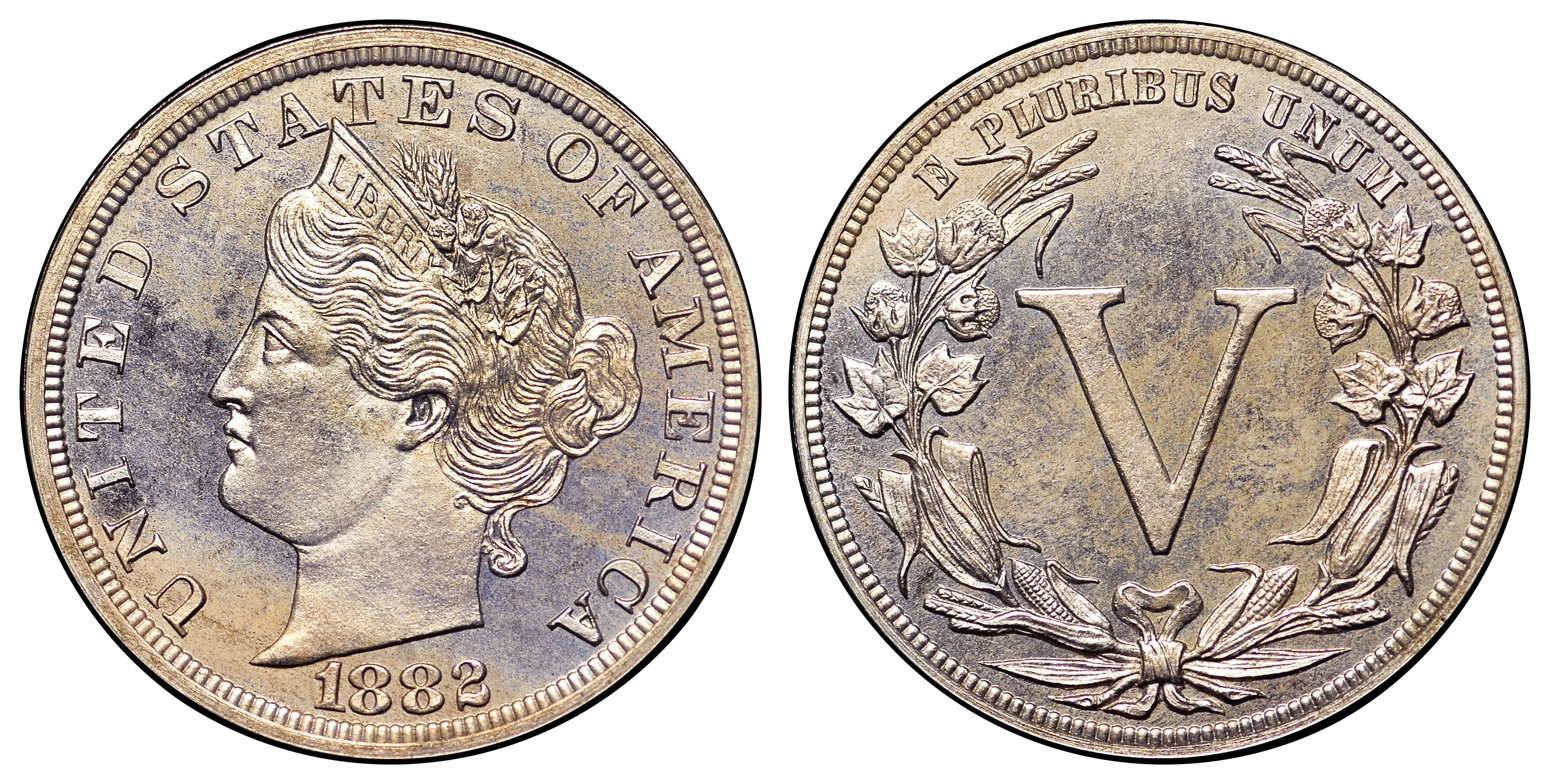
A pattern for the nickel by Barber

Barber duly produced the required designs. Fairly large numbers of pattern coins were struck. Barber's design for the nickel showed a portrait similar to that eventually adopted for the obverse, with "United States of America" and the date. The reverse featured the required wreath surrounding the "V", and no other lettering. A modified pattern design later that year added the words "In God We Trust" to the reverse. Snowden decided that the proposed cents and three-cent pieces would be too small for effective use, but Barber continued work on the nickel, with the size adjusted to 21.21 millimetres (0.835 in). Barber reworked the design in 1882, adding "E Pluribus Unum" (Note: "Out of many, one": a motto celebrating the union of the states into one country.) to the reverse. One variant that was struck as a pattern, but was not adopted, was a coin with five equally spaced notches in the rim of the coin. This "Blind Man's nickel" was struck at the request of Congressman and former Union General William S. Rosecrans, who stated that many of his wartime colleagues had been blinded by combat or disease.

Late that year, Barber's 1882 design was endorsed by Mint authorities, and 25 specimens were sent to Washington for routine approval by Treasury Secretary Charles J. Folger. To Snowden's surprise, Folger rejected the design. The secretary, on review of the coinage statutes, had realized that the laws required "United States of America" to appear on the reverse, not the obverse. Folger had then consulted with President Chester Arthur, who confirmed Folger's opinion. Snowden suggested that an exception should be made, but Folger refused, and Barber modified his design accordingly. The revised design was approved, and the coin was ready for striking in early 1883.

== Release ==
Striking of the new coins began on January 30, 1883, and the Mint placed the first pieces in circulation on February 1. Snowden, concerned about reports of speculation in 1883 proof Shield nickels, received permission on February 6 to continue striking proof Shield nickels for several months alongside the new pieces.

It had not been thought necessary to inscribe the word "cents" on the nickel; the silver and copper-nickel three-cent pieces had circulated for years with only a Roman numeral to indicate the denomination. Enterprising fraudsters soon realized that the new nickel was close in diameter to that of the five-dollar gold piece, and if the new coin was gold-plated, it might be passed for five dollars. They soon did so, and had success in passing the coin. Some coins were given a reeded edge by the fraudsters, to make them appear more like the gold coins. A widespread tale is that one of the perpetrators of this fraud was a man named Josh Tatum, who would go into a store, select an item costing five cents or less, and offer the gold-plated piece in payment—and many clerks gave him $4.95 in change. According to the tale, the law had no recourse against Tatum, as he had tendered the value of his purchase and had merely accepted the change as a gift. By some accounts, Tatum could not have misrepresented the value of the coin as he was a deaf-mute.

The plating of the nickels caused consternation at the Mint, and brought production of Liberty Head nickels to a sudden stop. Barber was told to modify his design, which he did, moving other design elements to accommodate the word "cents" at the bottom of the reverse design. The revised nickel was issued on June 26, 1883, the date on which production of the Shield nickel was finally stopped. The public responded by hoarding the "centless" nickels, egged on by reports that the Treasury Department intended to recall those nickels, and that they would become rare.

== Production ==
After heavy mintages of the nickel in 1883 and 1884, production was much lower in 1885 and 1886. This was due to an economic downturn which lowered demand for the coins. The 1886 production was also depressed by the Treasury's decision to reissue large numbers of worn minor coins. It was not until September 1886 that the Mint resumed full production of the coin. By 1887, however, the Mint was overwhelmed by orders, melting down large quantities of older copper-nickel coins to meet the demand. Despite these efforts, the Mint was forced to return many orders unfilled. Demand remained strong until 1894, when the Mint temporarily suspended production as it had accumulated a surplus during the Panic of 1893.

The Coinage Act of 1890 retired a number of obsolete denominations, including the three-cent piece. Another Act of Congress, also enacted on September 26, 1890 required that coinage designs not be changed until they had been in use 25 years, unless Congress authorized the change. However, the second act indicated that nothing in the law was to prevent the redesign of the current five-cent piece and silver dollar "as soon as practicable after the passage of this act". In 1896, pattern nickels were struck for the first time since 1885, when experimental, holed coins had been tested. The 1896 pieces, which featured a simple shield with arrows crossed behind it, were struck in response to a resolution of the House of Representatives asking the Secretary of the Treasury to report to it on the advantages and disadvantages of using various alloys in coinage. Pattern nickels would not be struck again until 1909.

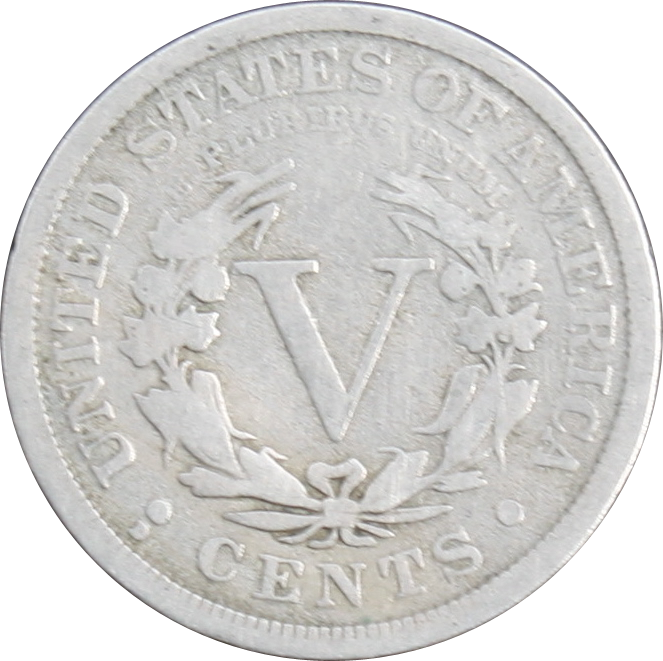
1912-D nickel; the mintmark D for Denver is found at lower left, by the dot.

The turn of the century saw unprecedented demand for nickels, due to a booming economy and the use of nickels in coin-operated machines. In 1900, Mint Director George E. Roberts called on Congress to grant the Mint a larger appropriation to purchase base metals, allowing for greater production of nickels and cents. The same year, the design was modified slightly, lengthening some of the leaves on the reverse. This change occurred with the introduction of a new hub, from which coining dies were made. Demand for the coins remained heavy; in March 1911, Mehl's Numismatic Monthly reported that the Mint was working twenty-four hours a day to produce cents and nickels, and even so was failing to satisfy demand.

Mint directors, in their annual reports, had long called for the authority to strike cents and nickels at all mints; by law they could then only be struck at Philadelphia. On April 24, 1906, this restriction was removed, although the first base metal coins, cents in both cases, were not struck at San Francisco until 1908 and Denver until 1911. In 1912, nickels were coined for the first time at each of the two branch mints. The 1912-S (for San Francisco) nickel was not struck until Christmas Eve, and was only struck for four business days. A 1912-S nickel, one of the first forty coined, was used by former San Francisco Mayor James D. Phelan to pay the first fare on the city's first streetcar on December 28, 1912. Excluding the 1913 nickel, the 1912-S, with only 238,000 struck, is by far the rarest in the series.

== Replacement ==
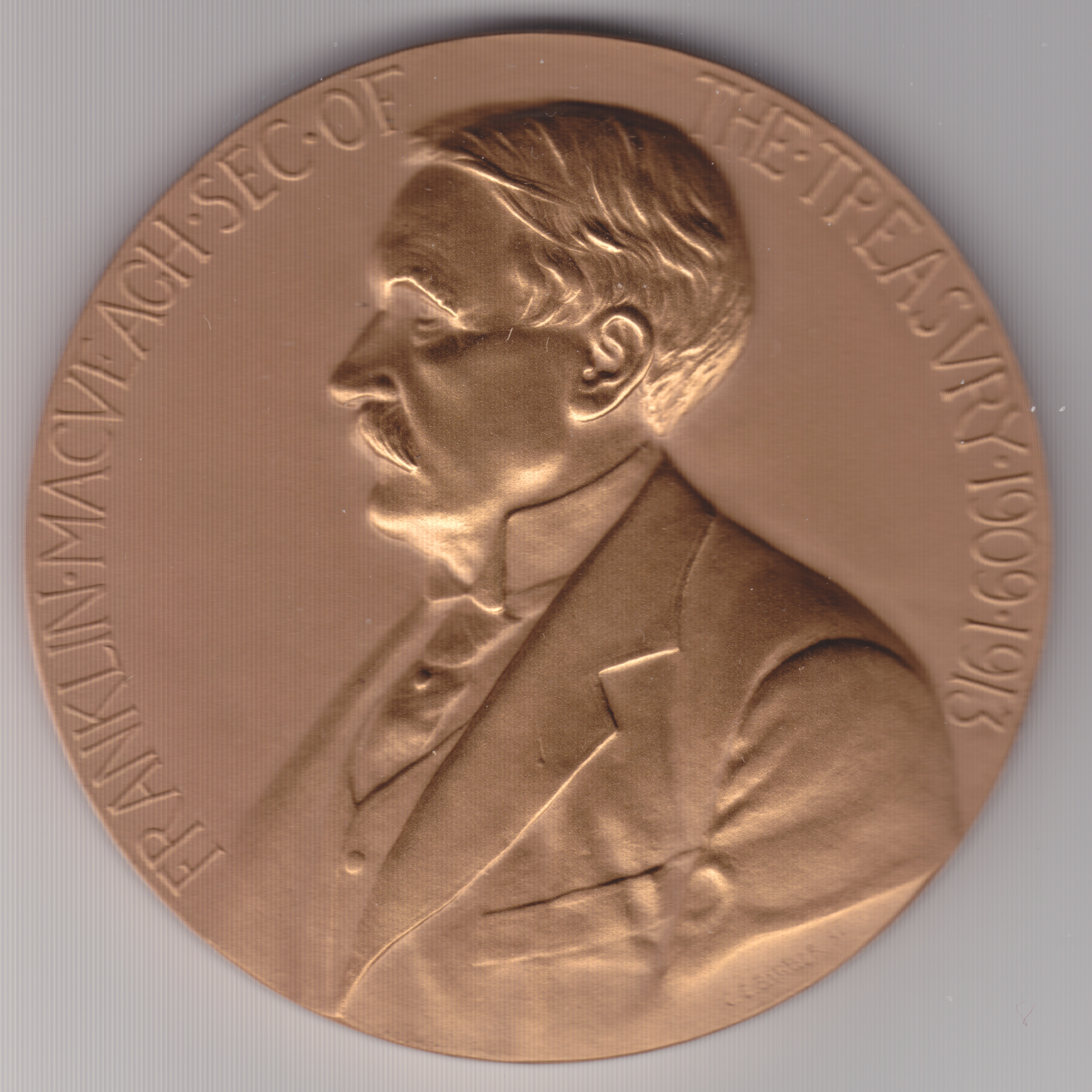
Treasury Secretary Franklin MacVeagh (depicted on a Mint medal) was instrumental in the replacement of the Liberty Head nickel by the Buffalo nickel.

In 1909, consideration was given to the replacement of the Liberty Head nickel by a new design. In an attempt to modernize the coinage, the cent and the gold pieces had been redesigned. Prominent artists from outside the Mint had been contracted to provide the designs of the new coins, much to Barber's disgruntlement. Mint Director Frank A. Leach was an admirer of Barber's work, and had him prepare designs to be struck as patterns. Barber, at Leach's request, prepared a design showing Washington's head, and newspapers reported that new coins might be issued by the end of 1909. In July 1909, however, Leach resigned, putting an end to the matter for the time being.

On May 4, 1911, Eames MacVeagh, son of Treasury Secretary Franklin MacVeagh wrote to his father:

A little matter that seems to have been overlooked by all of you is the opportunity to beautify the design of the nickel or five cent piece during your administration, and it seems to me that it would be a permanent souvenir of a most attractive sort. As possibly you are aware, it is the only coin the design of which you can change during your administration, as I believe there is a law to the effect that the designs must not be changed oftener than every twenty-five years. I should think also it might be the coin of which the greatest numbers are in circulation.

Soon afterwards, Deputy Secretary of the Treasury Abram Andrew announced that the Mint would be soliciting new designs. Well-known sculptor James Earle Fraser approached Treasury officials, who were impressed by his proposals. Mint Director Roberts initially asked Fraser for a design featuring a bust of Lincoln, which he produced, mainly to please Roberts, but Fraser also developed a design featuring a Native American on the obverse, with an American bison on the reverse. This design was given preliminary approval by MacVeagh on January 13, 1912, and would come to be known as the Buffalo nickel. In late June, Fraser completed the model of the final design. The specifications of the new nickel were provided to the Hobbs Manufacturing Company, a maker of vending machines, which, following a meeting with Fraser in early November, opined that the new coins would likely jam its machines. At the company's request, Fraser prepared a revised version, but Secretary MacVeagh rejected it on the grounds that the changes compromised the design, which he greatly admired.

On December 13, 1912, Roberts warned the Mint staff to take no action in preparation for the 1913 five-cent coinage until the new designs were ready. He ended production of the Liberty Head nickel at the Philadelphia Mint the same day. A minor change was made to the Buffalo design in an attempt to satisfy the Hobbs Company, which promptly provided a lengthy list of changes it wanted made to the coin. On February 15, 1913, with less than three weeks until he would have to leave office on the advent of the Wilson administration, McVeagh wrote to Roberts, noting that no other vending or slot machine maker had complained about the new design. The Secretary concluded that everything possible had been done to satisfy the Hobbs Company, and ordered the new nickel put into production.

== 1913 ==
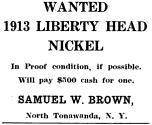
Ad placed by Brown in The Numismatist, December 1919

The first information that a 1913 Liberty head nickel might have been struck came in December 1919, when coin dealer Samuel W. Brown placed advertisements in numismatic publications, offering to buy any such nickels. In August 1920, Brown displayed one such coin at the annual American Numismatic Association (ANA) convention. Brown related that a master die had been prepared for the 1913 Liberty head nickels, and a few pieces had been run off to test the die. As it turned out, Brown possessed five coins, which he eventually sold. After spending fifteen years in the hands of the eccentric Col. E.H.R. Green, the famous Fort Worth, Texas, area collector, the coins were finally dispersed in 1943. Since then, the coins have had several owners each. Today, three are on public display, one at the Smithsonian Institution in Washington, DC and two reside at the ANA's Money Museum in Colorado Springs, while two are owned privately. One price recorded for a 1913 Liberty Head nickel was in January 2010, when one sold for $3,737,500 in an auction. Recent sales of a 1913 Liberty Head nickel were in April 2013 for more than $3.1 million and for $4.5 million at auction in August 2018.

It is uncertain how the 1913 nickels came to be made. The Mint's records show no production of 1913 Liberty head nickels, and none were authorized to be made. Dies were prepared in advance and sent to California for a 1913-S Liberty Head nickel coinage, but upon Roberts's instruction to stop coinage, they were ordered returned to Philadelphia. They were received by December 23, and were almost certainly destroyed routinely by early January. Brown had been an employee at the Philadelphia Mint (although this was not known until 1963) and many theories focus suspicion on him.

== Bibliography ==
- Bowers, Q. David (2006). A Guide Book of Shield and Liberty Head Nickels. Atlanta, Ga.: Whitman Publishing. ISBN 978-0-7948-1921-7.
- Lange, David W. (2006). History of the United States Mint and its Coinage. Atlanta, Ga.: Whitman Publishing. ISBN 978-0-7948-1972-9.
- Montgomery, Paul; Borckardt, Mark; Knight, Ray (2005). Million Dollar Nickel. Irvine, Ca.: Zyrus Press. ISBN 978-0-9742371-8-3.
- Peters, Gloria; Mohon, Cynthia (1995). The Complete Guide to Shield & Liberty Head Nickels. Virginia Beach, Va.: DLRC Press. ISBN 978-1-880731-52-9.
- Richardson, William Allen, ed. (1891). Supplement to the revised statutes of the United States. Vol. 1. Washington, D.C.: US Government Printing Office.
- Taxay, Don (1983). The U.S. Mint and Coinage (reprint of 1966 ed.). New York, N.Y.: Sanford J. Durst Numismatic Publications. ISBN 978-0-915262-68-7.
- Yeoman, R.S. (2014). Bressett, Kenneth (ed.). A Guide Book of United States Coins 2015 (68th ed.). Atlanta, Georgia: Whitman Publishing. ISBN 978-079484215-4. OCLC 875521690. OL 28306197M.

Online sources

- "Rare U.S. coin fetches over US$3.7 million at auction". The China Post. January 1, 2010. Archived from the original on March 5, 2016.
