= Nanine Vallain =

French artist (1767–1815)

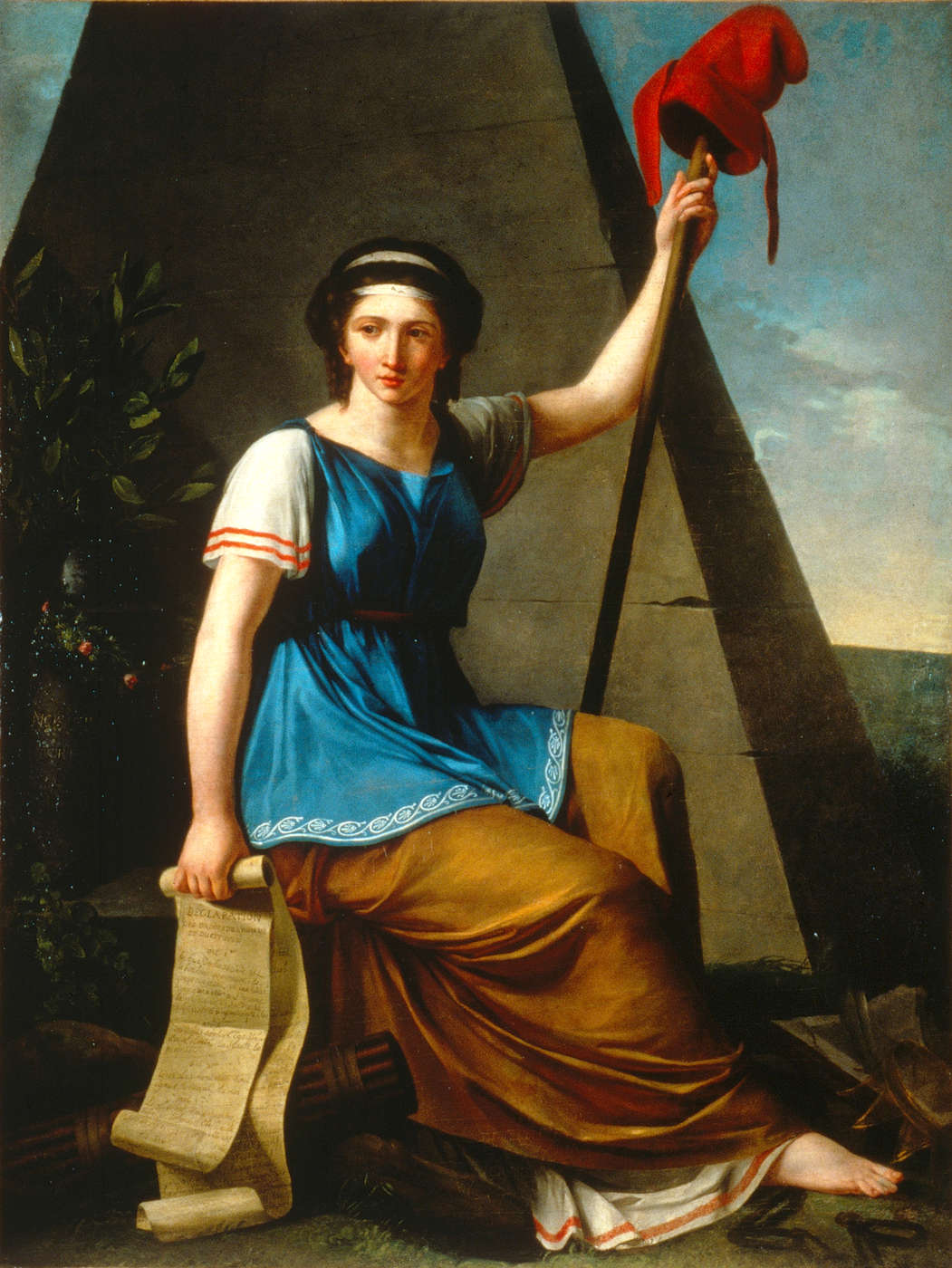
Liberty, 1793–1794, Musée de la Révolution française.

Nanine Vallain (1767–1815) was a French painter active between 1785 and 1810. She was sometimes known as Jeanne-Louise Vallain or Madame Piètre.

Vallain was a native of Paris, born into the family of a master scribe. She took lessons in painting and drawing with Jacques-Louis David and Joseph-Benoît Suvée. Vallain was first recognized by art critics in 1785 during the Exposition de la Jeunesse, an annual exhibit at the place Dauphine, by a critic with the Mercure de France. She returned there in 1787 with the work L'Etude, and was "praised for her firm handling, sophistication, harmony and agreeable colour and brushwork." Her final exhibition at the Exposition de la Jeunesse took place in 1788, after which she exhibited in other locations in Paris. In these early years of her career, Vallain primarily painted portraits, similar to many other women artists of the time period.

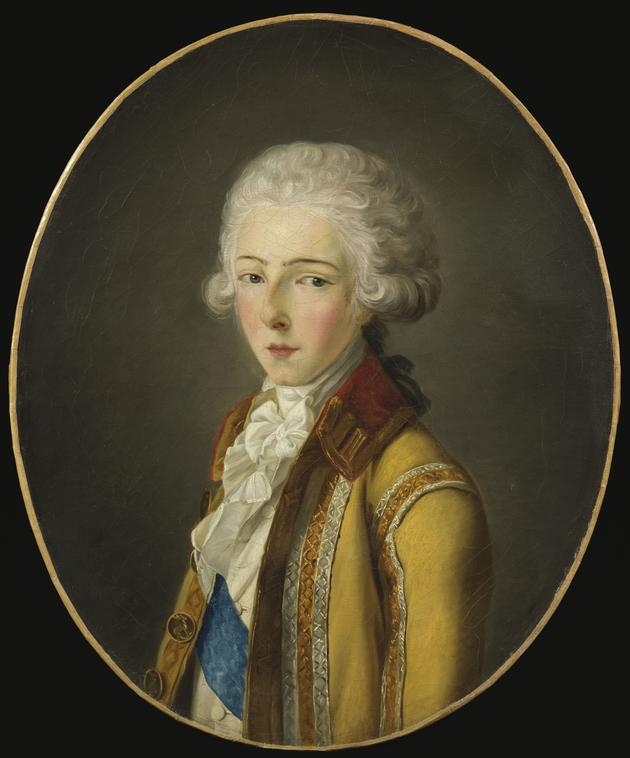
Portrait of Louis-Antoine-Henry de Bourbon-Condé, duc d'Enghien, c. 1788, in the Musée Condé

Vallain married Barthèlemy Piètre in 1793. In October of that same year she joined the Commune générale des arts during the brief window of time it allowed women to join. It was at this time that she produced her best-known work, an allegory of Liberty which hung in the Jacobin Club until it closed in 1794. Vallain began participating in the Salon in Paris in 1793, continuing until 1810, though she did not exhibit at all between the years 1796 and 1805. The paintings she exhibited at the Salon between 1806 and 1810 were primarily allegorical and biblical, including: Sappho Singing a Hymn to Love, Cain Fleeing with His Family after the Death of Abel and Tirzan, Wife of Abel, Crying on the Tomb of her Spouse and Imploring Mercury, and Portrait of a Lady.

Later in her career Vallin's work received little attention, and by 1832 was forgotten; she is not listed in Charles Gabet's 1832 dictionary of French artists of the period. She specialized in portraits, but also painted genre scenes, historical works, biblical scenes, and allegories. A Portrait of a Lady, circa 1805, is currently held by the National Gallery of Ireland. Her Portrait of Louis-Antoine-Henry de Bourbon-Condé, duc d'Enghien, dating to around 1788, is in the Musée Condé, while a Portrait of a Young Girl with a Lamb from 1788 is held by the Musée Cognacq-Jay. Her well-known depiction of Liberty is now owned by the Louvre.
