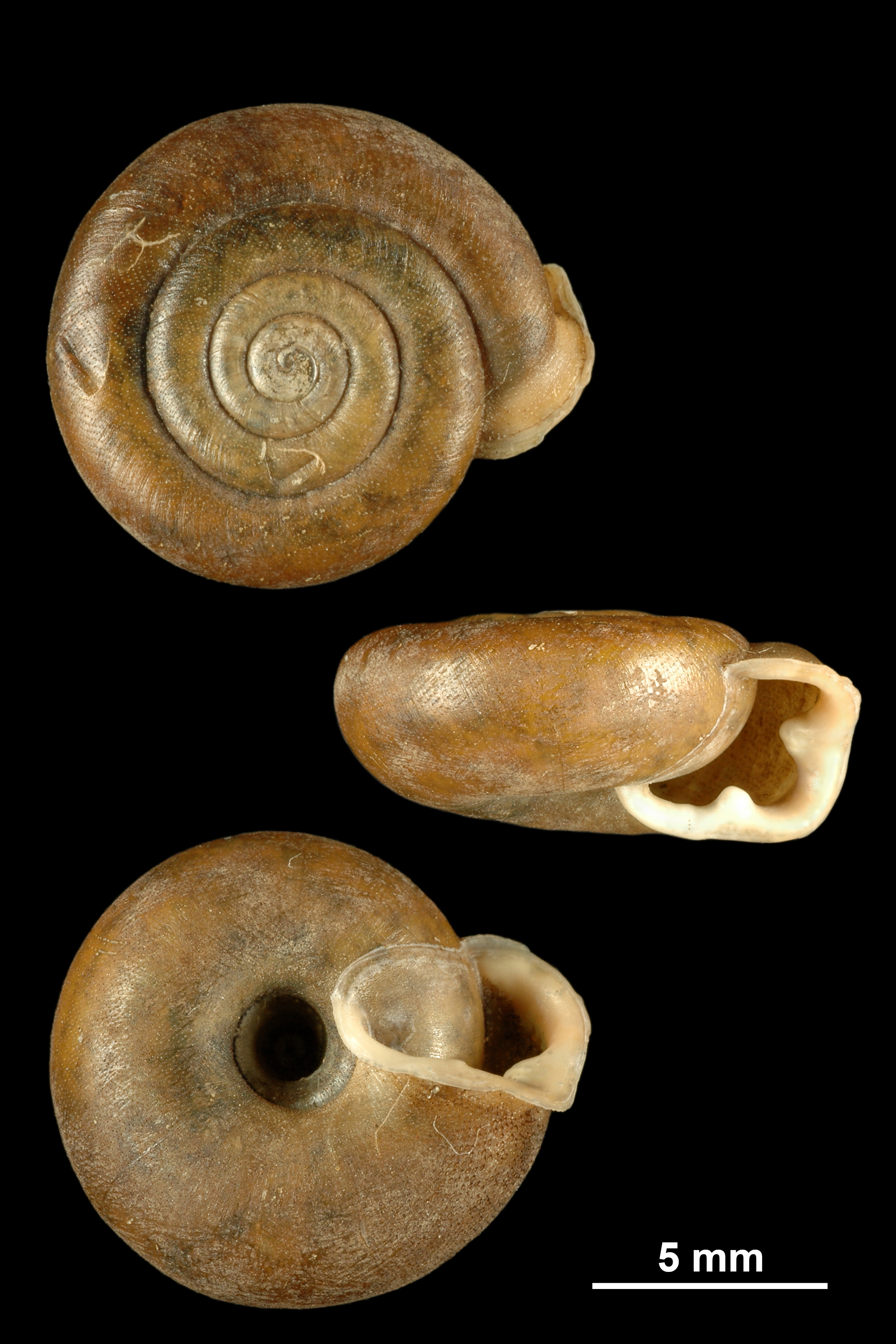
- Shell of Causa holosericea (specimen at MNHN, Paris)

Scientific classification
- Domain: Eukaryota
- Kingdom: Animalia
- Phylum: Mollusca
- Class: Gastropoda
- Order: Stylommatophora
- Family: Helicidae
- Genus: Causa
- Species: C. holosericea

Binomial name
- Causa holosericea (S. Studer, 1820)

Synonyms
- Helix holosericea Gmelin, 1791; Glischrus (Helix) holosericea S. Studer, 1820; Isognomostoma holosericum (S. Studer, 1820)

= Causa holosericea =

Species of gastropod

Causa holosericea is a species of air-breathing land snail, a terrestrial pulmonate gastropod mollusk in the family Helicidae.

== Distribution ==
The distribution of this species is Alpine.

- Czech Republic
- Poland
- Slovakia
- Italy
- Germany
- France
- Austria
- Croatia
- Liechtenstein
- Slovenia

== Shell description ==
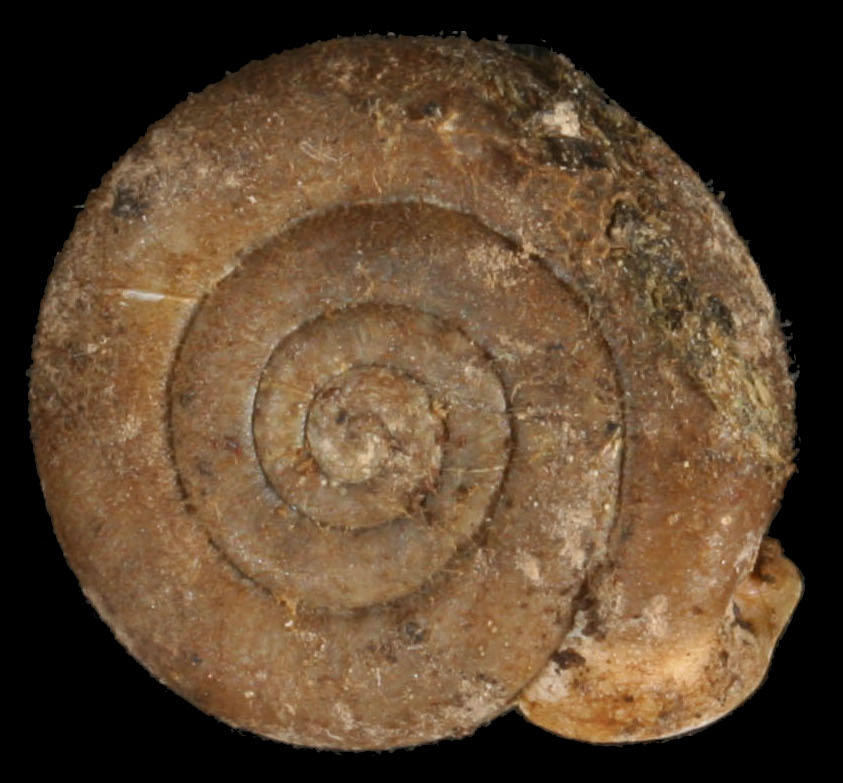
apical view

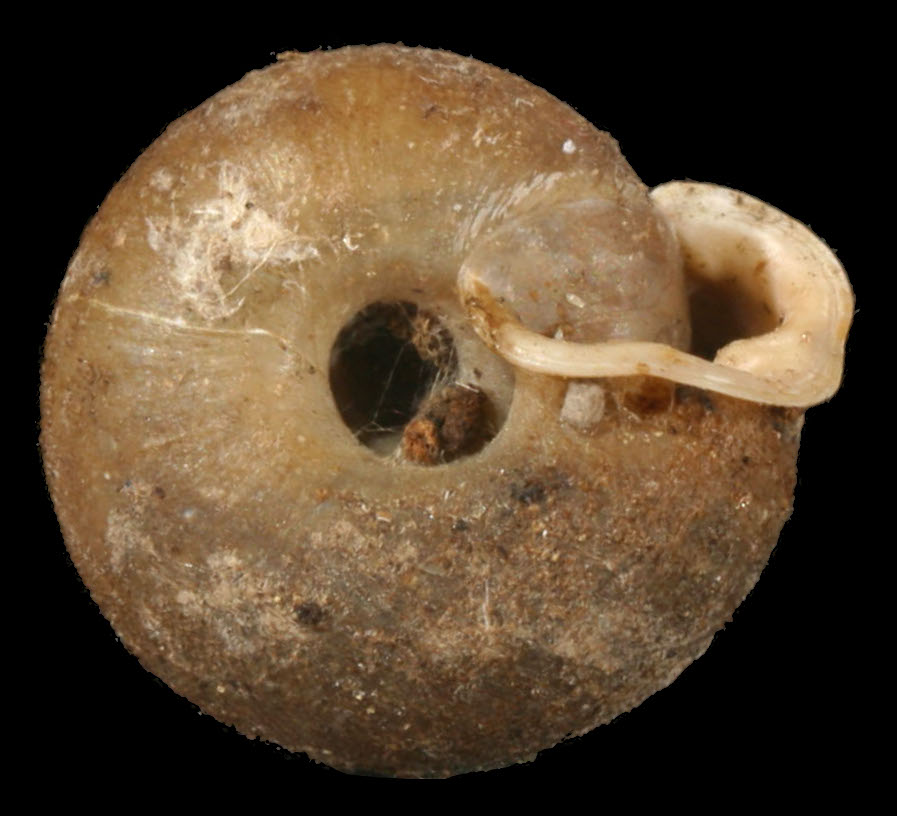
umbilical view
