= We Owe Allegiance to No Crown =

1814 oil on canvas painting by John Archibald Woodside

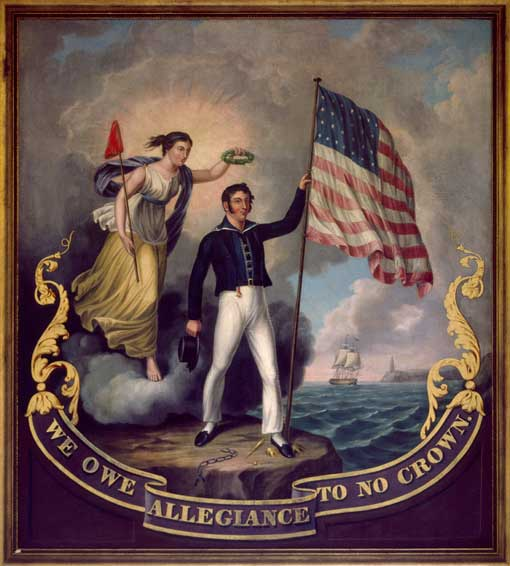
We Owe Allegiance To No Crown by John A. Woodside (1814)

We Owe Allegiance to No Crown is a large (60 by 50 inches) 1814 oil on canvas painting by Philadelphian artist John Archibald Woodside. This painting was displayed in the National Portrait Gallery in Washington, D.C., for the exhibition, "1812: A Nation Emerges", from June 2012-January 2013.

== Background ==
Woodside was born in Philadelphia, where his father worked as an engrossing clerk. It is said that Woodside received his training in painting from Matthew Pratt or one of his business partners in the sign-painting business, William Clarke, Jeremiah Paul, Jr., or George Rutter. In 1805, Woodside opened his own studio for forty-seven years. He became famous not only for sign-painting around Philadelphia, but also for still life, fruit, and animals. From 1817 to 1836, Woodside exhibited paintings at the Pennsylvania Academy of the Fine Arts, in whose catalogues he was described as a "Painter [of] Animals and Still Life."

Woodside was more well known for his allegorical paintings and firemen hat panels. In 1816, Woodside was commissioned to create the city of Philadelphia's coat of arms. This painting depicts allegorical figures of Justice and Plenty. His firemen hat panels, commissioned for parades in 1840s, similarly contained allegorical figures of Justice and Plenty but in a variety of positions and settings.

== Interpretation ==
Woodside, inspired by the War of 1812, intended to provide an allegorical message in response to the defeat of Britain. It depicts a sailor holding a flag being crowned with a laurel wreath by Liberty, with the words “We Owe Allegiance to No Crown” below. The ship, towards the back of the painting, depicts the small but effective American Navy that greatly contributed to the American defeat of Britain.

== Modern usage ==
This painting has appeared on the cover of books pertaining to the War of 1812, including Free Trade and Sailors' Rights of the War of 1812 and 1812: War and Passions of Patriotism. These two books were written in 2012 and 2013, two hundred years after the War of 1812.
