= Liberty (personification) =

Personifications of the concept of Liberty

Depictions of Liberty

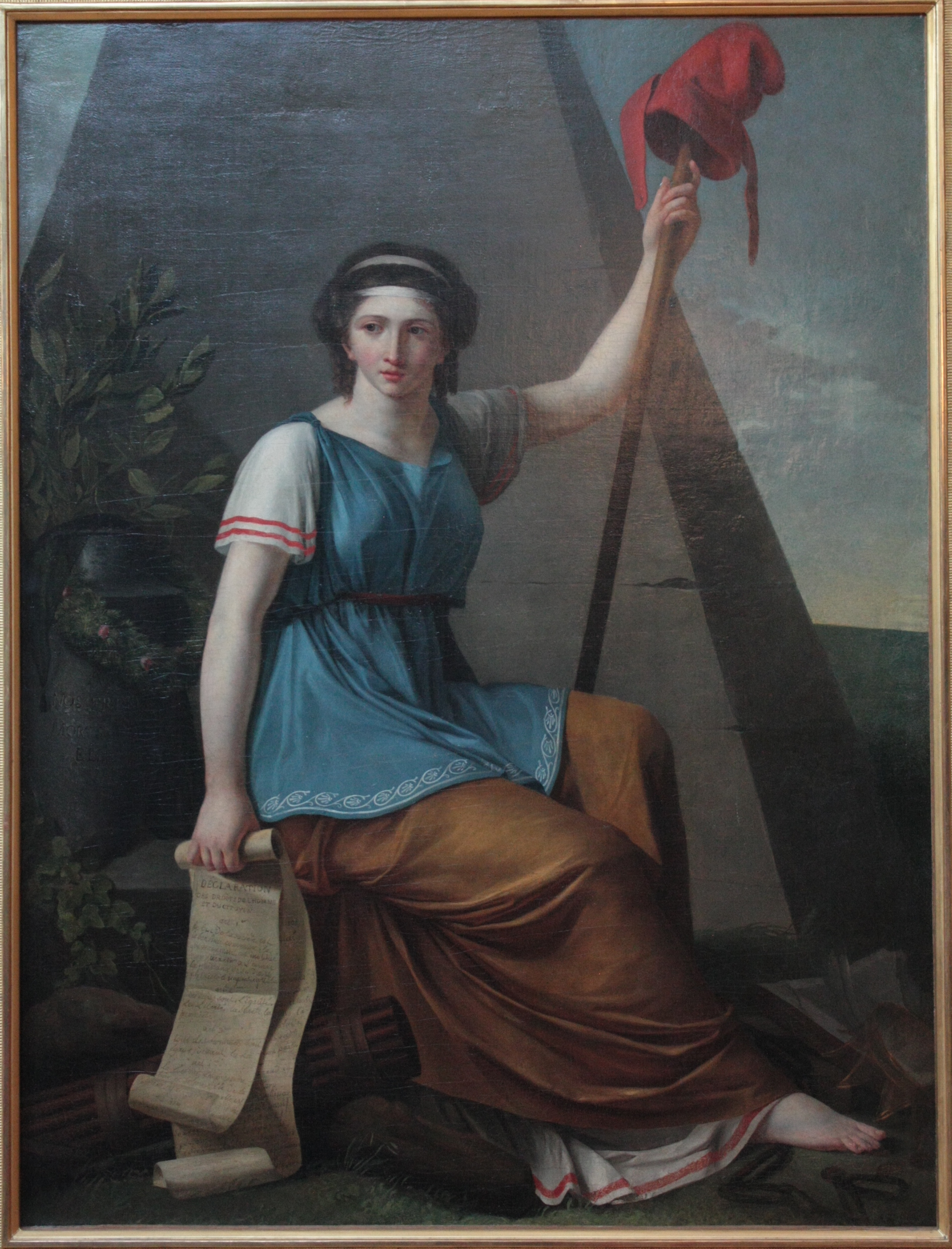
La liberté, Nanine Vallain, 1794

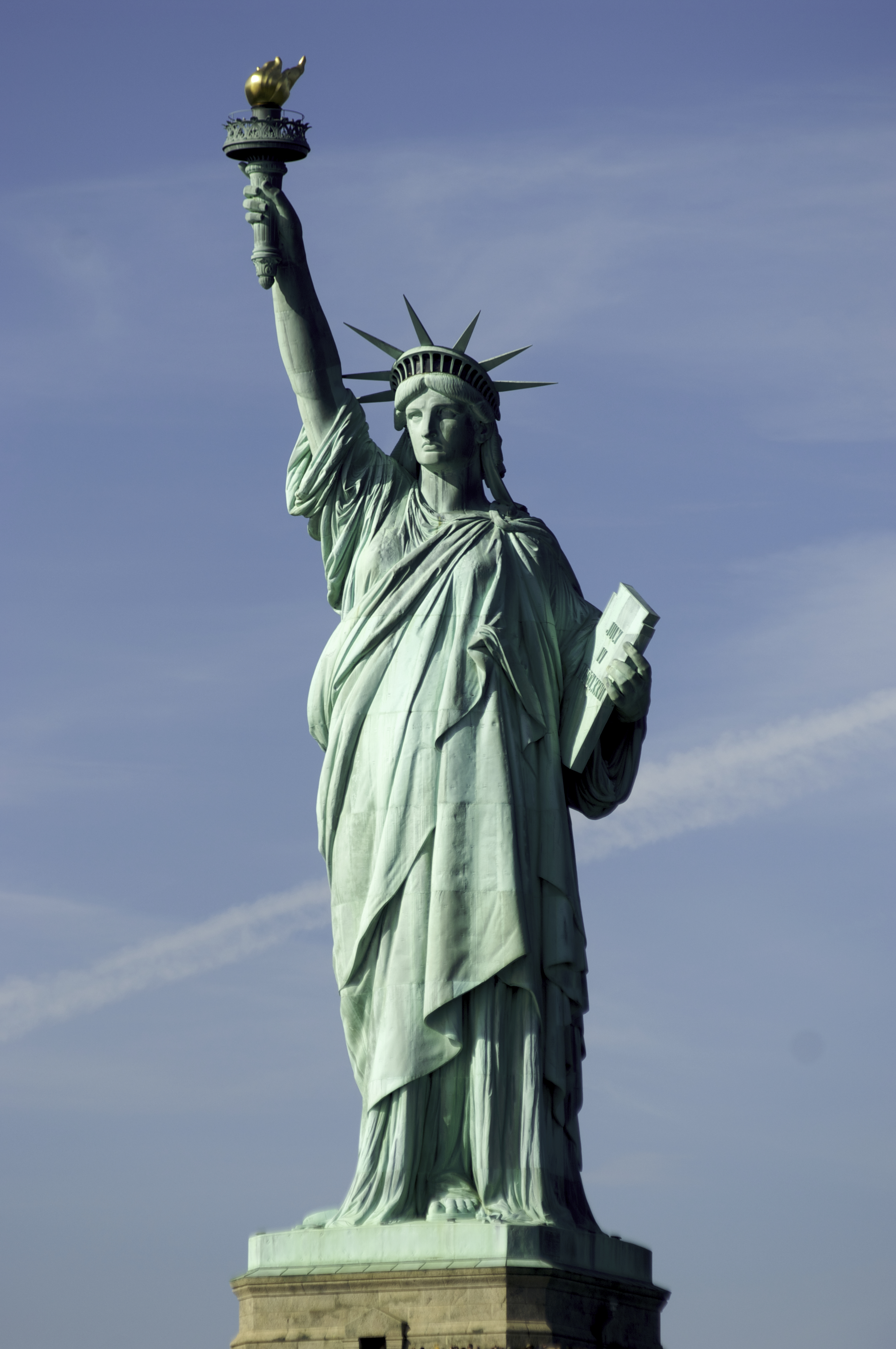
Statue of Liberty (Liberty Enlightening the World), 1886, New York, by Frédéric Auguste Bartholdi

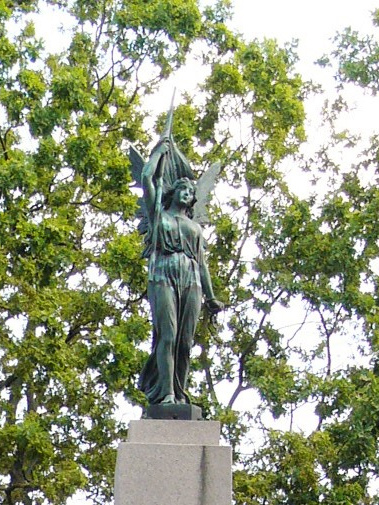
Freedom Monument, 1928, Kaunas, Lithuania, by Juozas Zikaras

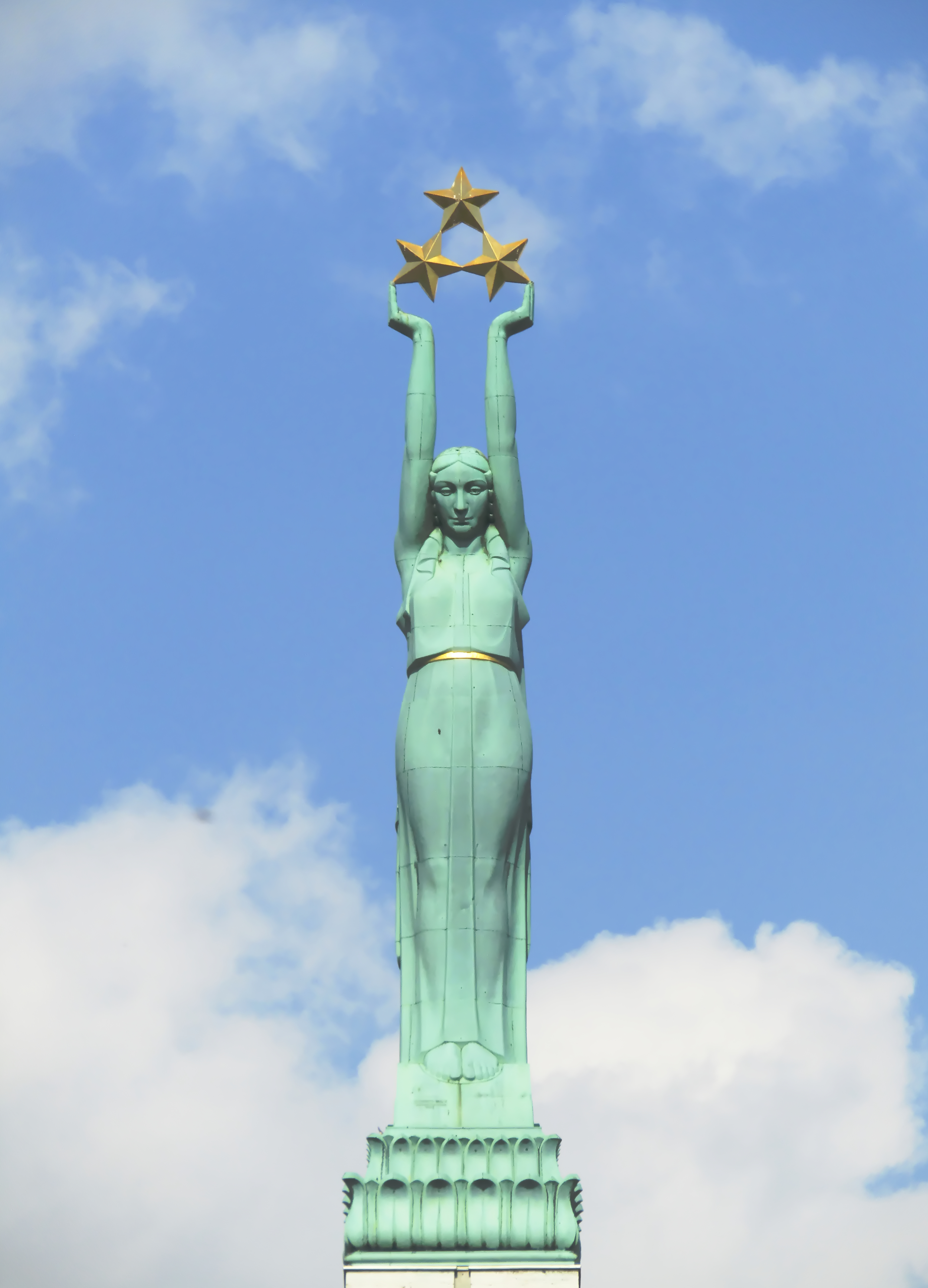
Freedom Monument, 1935, Riga, Latvia, by Kārlis Zāle

The concept of liberty has frequently been represented by personifications, often loosely shown as a female classical goddess. Examples include Marianne, the national personification of the French Republic and its values of Liberté, Égalité, Fraternité, and the female Liberty portrayed in artworks, on United States coins beginning in 1793, and many other depictions. These descend from images on ancient Roman coins of the Roman goddess Libertas and from various developments from the Renaissance onwards. The Dutch Maiden was among the first, re-introducing the cap of liberty on a liberty pole featured in many types of image, though not using the Phrygian cap style that became conventional. The 1886 Statue of Liberty (Liberty Enlightening the World) by Frédéric Auguste Bartholdi is a well-known example in art, a gift from France to the United States.

== Ancient Rome ==
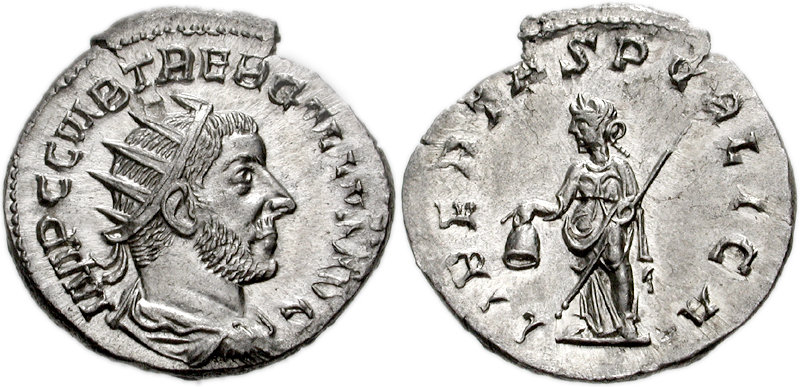
Coin of Trebonianus Gallus (coincidentally with a radiant crown) and "Libertas Publica" holding out a pileus, and carrying her rod. AD 251–253

The ancient Roman goddess Libertas was honored during the second Punic War (218 to 201 BC) by a temple erected on the Aventine Hill in Rome by the father of Tiberius Gracchus. In a highly political gesture, a temple for her was raised in 58 BC by Publius Clodius Pulcher on the site of Marcus Tullius Cicero's house after it had been razed. When depicted as a standing figure, on the reverse of coins, she usually holds out, but never wears, a pileus, the soft cap that symbolised the granting of freedom to former slaves. She also carries a rod, which formed part of the ceremony for manumission. In the 18th century, the pileus turned into the similar Phrygian cap carried on a pole by English-speaking "Liberty" figures, and then worn by Marianne and other 19th-century personifications, as the "cap of liberty".

Libertas had been important under the Roman Republic, and was somewhat uncomfortably co-opted by the empire; it was not seen as an innate right, but as granted to some under Roman law. Her attribute of the pileus appeared on the Ides of March coin of the assassins of Julius Caesar, defenders of the Roman republic, between two daggers with the inscription "EID MAR" (Eidibus Martiis – on the Ides of March).

== Early modern period ==
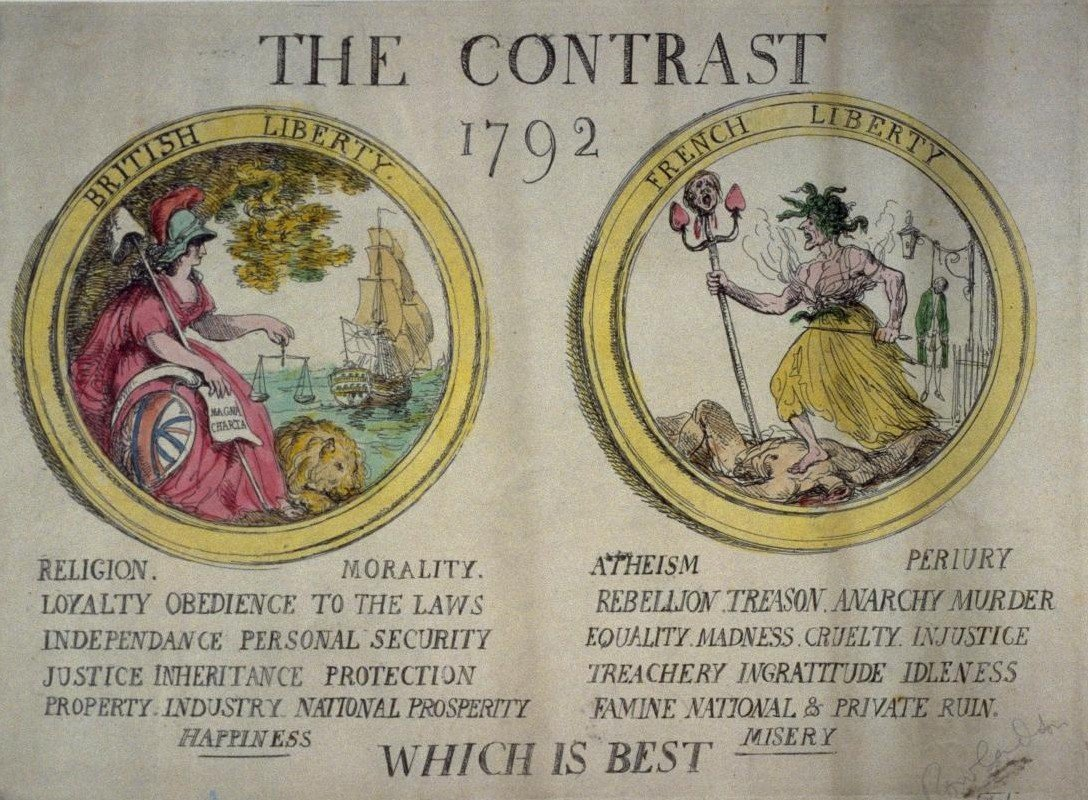
The Contrast: 1792: Which Is Best, by Thomas Rowlandson, an anti-French cartoon

Liberty Leading the People, 1830, by Eugène Delacroix, with the modern French national personification Marianne

Great Seal of the Second French Republic, 1848, with radiant crown

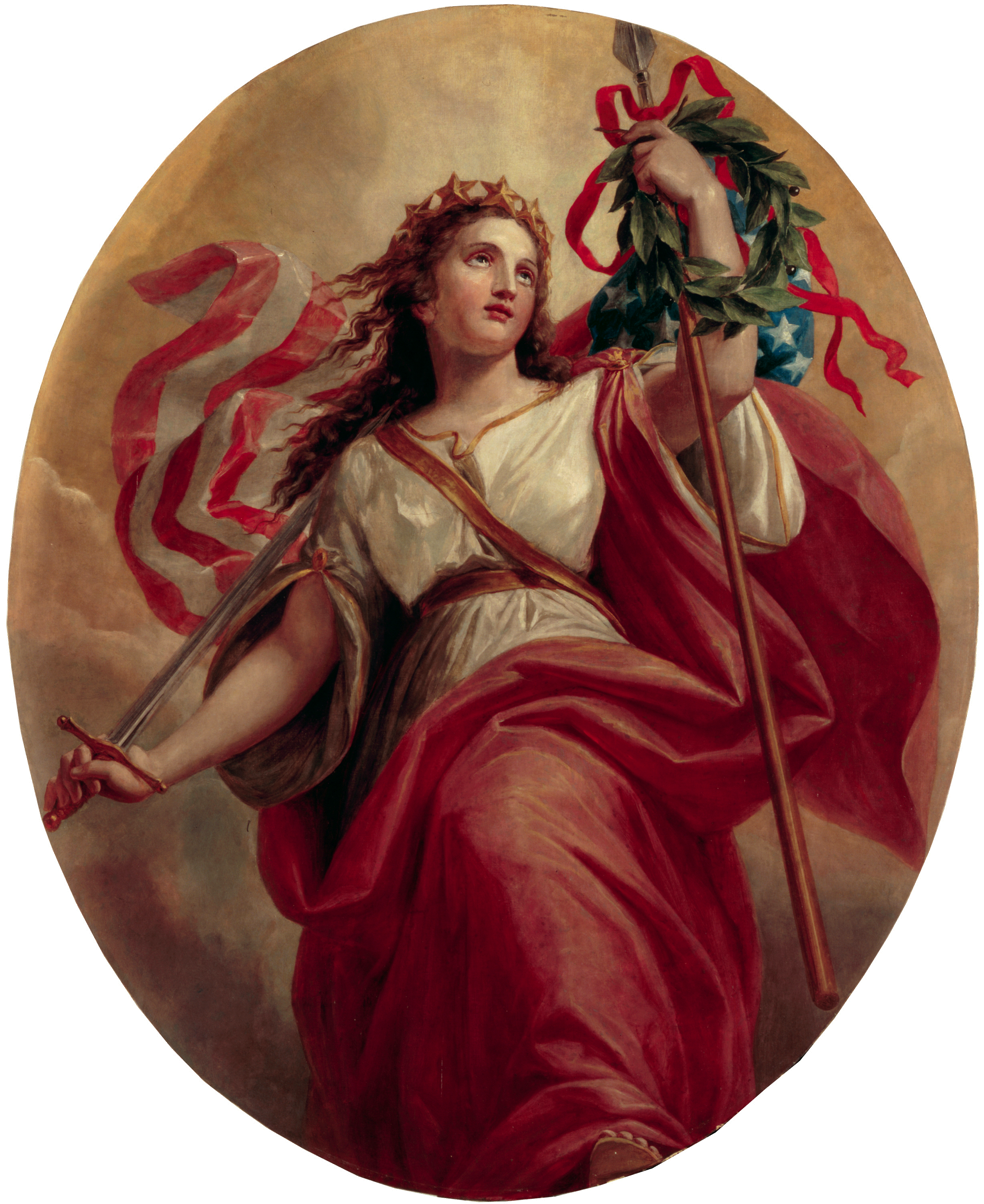
Liberty, by Constantino Brumidi 1869

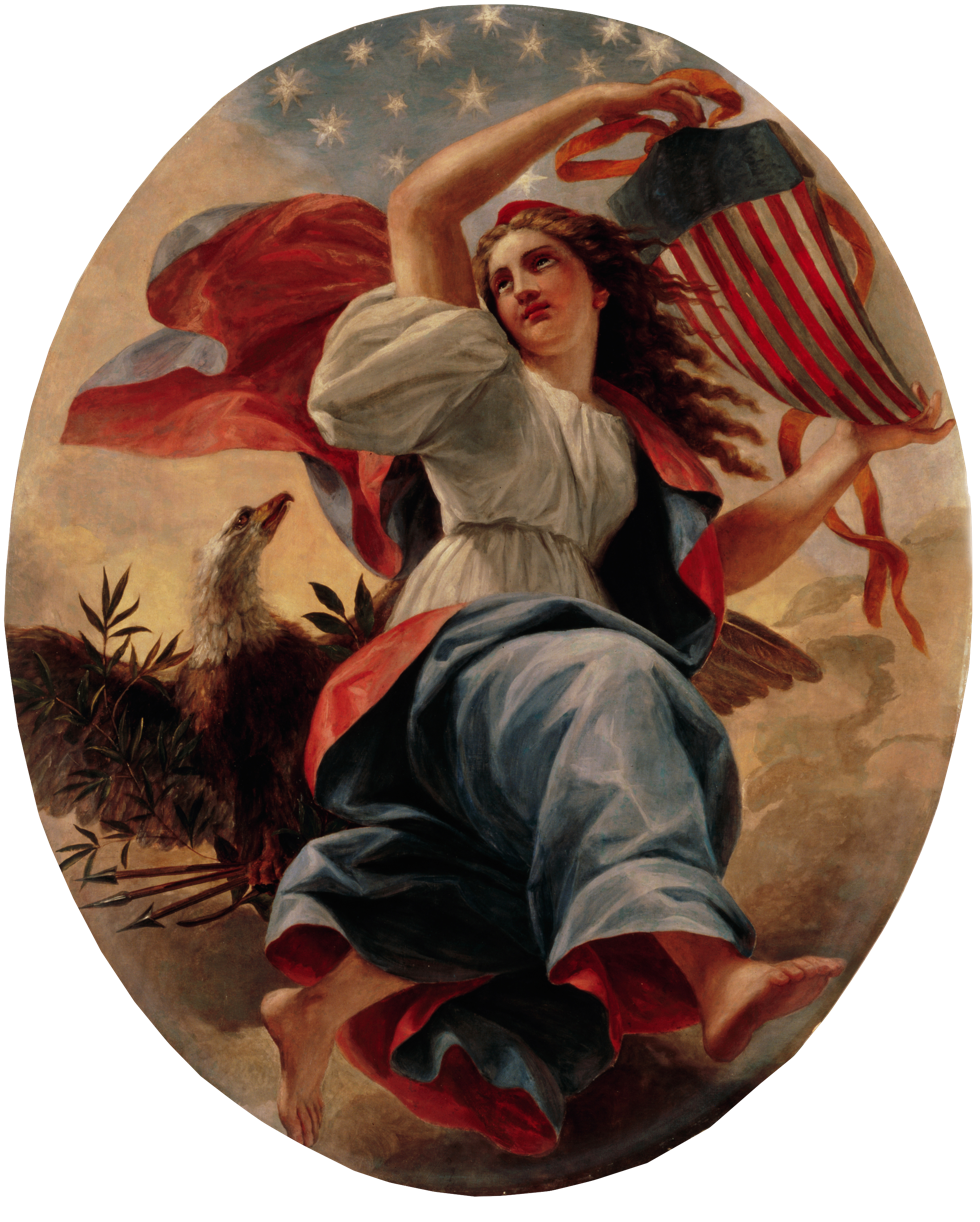
Union, Brumidi's allegory of Perpetual Union, the companion piece to Liberty

The medieval republics, mostly in Italy, greatly valued their liberty, and often use the word, but produce very few direct personifications. One exception, showing just the cap of liberty between daggers, a copy of coins by the assassins of Julius Caesar, featured on a medal struck by Lorenzino de' Medici to commemorate his assassination of his cousin Alessandro de' Medici, Duke of Florence in 1547. Liberty featured in emblem books, usually with her cap; the most popular, the Iconologia of Cesare Ripa, showed the cap held on a pole by the 1611 edition.

With the rise of nationalism and new states, many nationalist personifications included a strong element of liberty, perhaps culminating in the Statue of Liberty. The long poem Liberty by the Scottish James Thomson (1734), is a lengthy monologue spoken by the "Goddess of Liberty", "characterized as British Liberty", describing her travels through the ancient world, and then English and British history, before the resolution of the Glorious Revolution of 1688 confirms her position there. Thomson also wrote the lyrics for Rule Britannia, and the two personifications were often combined as a personified "British Liberty".

A large monument, originally called the "Column of British Liberty", now usually just the "Column to Liberty", was begun in the 1750s on his Gibside estate outside Newcastle-on-Tyne by the hugely wealthy Sir George Bowes, reflecting his Whig politics. Set at the top of a steep hillock, the monument itself is taller than Nelson's Column in London, and topped by a bronze female figure, originally gilded, carrying a cap of liberty on a pole. In other images, she took the seated form already very familiar from the British copper coinage, where Britannia had first appeared in 1672, with shield but carrying the cap on a rod as a liberty pole, rather than her usual trident.

In the run up to the American War of Independence, this conflated figure of Britannia/Liberty was attractive to American colonists agitating for the full set of British civil rights, and from 1770 some American newspapers adopted her for their masthead. When war broke out, the Britannia element quickly disappeared, but a classical-looking Liberty still appealed, and was now sometimes just labelled "America". In the 1790s Columbia, who had been sometimes present in literature for some decades, emerged as a common name for this figure. Her position was cemented by the popular song Hail, Columbia (1798).

By the time of the French Revolution the modern type of imagery was well-established, and the French figure acquired the name of Marianne from 1792. Unlike her predecessors, she normally wore the cap of Liberty on her head, rather than carrying it on a pole or lance. In 1793 the Notre Dame de Paris cathedral was turned into a "Temple of Reason" and, for a brief time, the Goddess of Liberty replaced the Virgin Mary on several altars.

The Great Seal of France, applied to the official copies of legislation, had a Marianne with Phrygian cap of liberty from 1792, until she was replaced the next year by a Hercules after Jacques-Louis David. A standing Liberty, with fasces and cap on a pole, was on the seal of Napoleon's French Consulate, before being replaced by his head. Liberty returned to the seal with the French Second Republic in 1848, seated amid symbols of agriculture and industry, designed by Jacques-Jean Barre. She carries fasces on her lap, now wears a radiant crown with seven spikes or rays, and leans on a rudder. After a gap with the Second French Empire, a version of the 1848 design was used by the French Third Republic and under subsequent republics to the present day. The radiant crown, never used in antiquity for Libertas (but for the sun god Sol Invictus and some later emperors), was adopted by Frédéric Auguste Bartholdi for the Statue of Liberty. This was conceived in the 1860s, under the French Second Republic, when Liberty no longer featured on the seal or in French official iconography. The Great Seal's rudder was another original borrowing from classical iconography. In Roman art it (called a gubernaculum) was the usual attribute of Fortuna, or "Lady Luck", representing her control of the changeable fortunes of life.

As well as such dignified representations, all these figures very frequently figured in the political cartoons that were becoming extremely popular in all the countries concerned over this period. The Napoleonic Wars produced a particular outpouring of cartoons on all sides.

In the 19th century various national personifications took on this form, some wearing the cap of liberty. The Dutch Maiden, accompanied by the Leo Belgicus became the official symbol of the Batavian Republic established after the French occupied the Netherlands.

== Depictions in the United States ==
In the United States, "Liberty" is often depicted with five-pointed stars, as they appear on the American flag, usually held in a raised hand. Another hand may hold a sword which points downward. Depictions which are familiar to Americans include the following:

- The Statue of Liberty (Liberty Enlightening the World), its replicas, and its portrayal on many U.S. postage stamps and coins
- Many denominations of American coins have depicted Liberty in both bust side-view and full-figure designs; see also the Liberty dollar, Seated Liberty dollar, Liberty dime, Walking Liberty half dollar, Indian Head cent, Morgan dollar, Silver Eagle, Gold Eagle, American Innovation dollar, and others
- The flags of the States of New York and New Jersey (along with various signs and public-owned items bearing the Seal of New Jersey)
- On the dome of the U.S. Capitol as Freedom
- On the dome of the Georgia State Capitol as Miss Freedom
- On the dome of the Texas State Capitol as Goddess of Liberty
- On the dome of the Wisconsin State Capitol as Wisconsin
- On the dome of the Allen County Courthouse in Fort Wayne, Indiana
- On the dome of the Bergen County Courthouse in Hackensack, New Jersey
- Atop the Yorktown Victory Monument on the Yorktown Battlefield near Yorktown, Virginia
- On both Union and Confederate currency

In the early decades of the 20th century, Liberty mostly displaced Columbia, who was widely used as the national personification of the US during the 19th century.

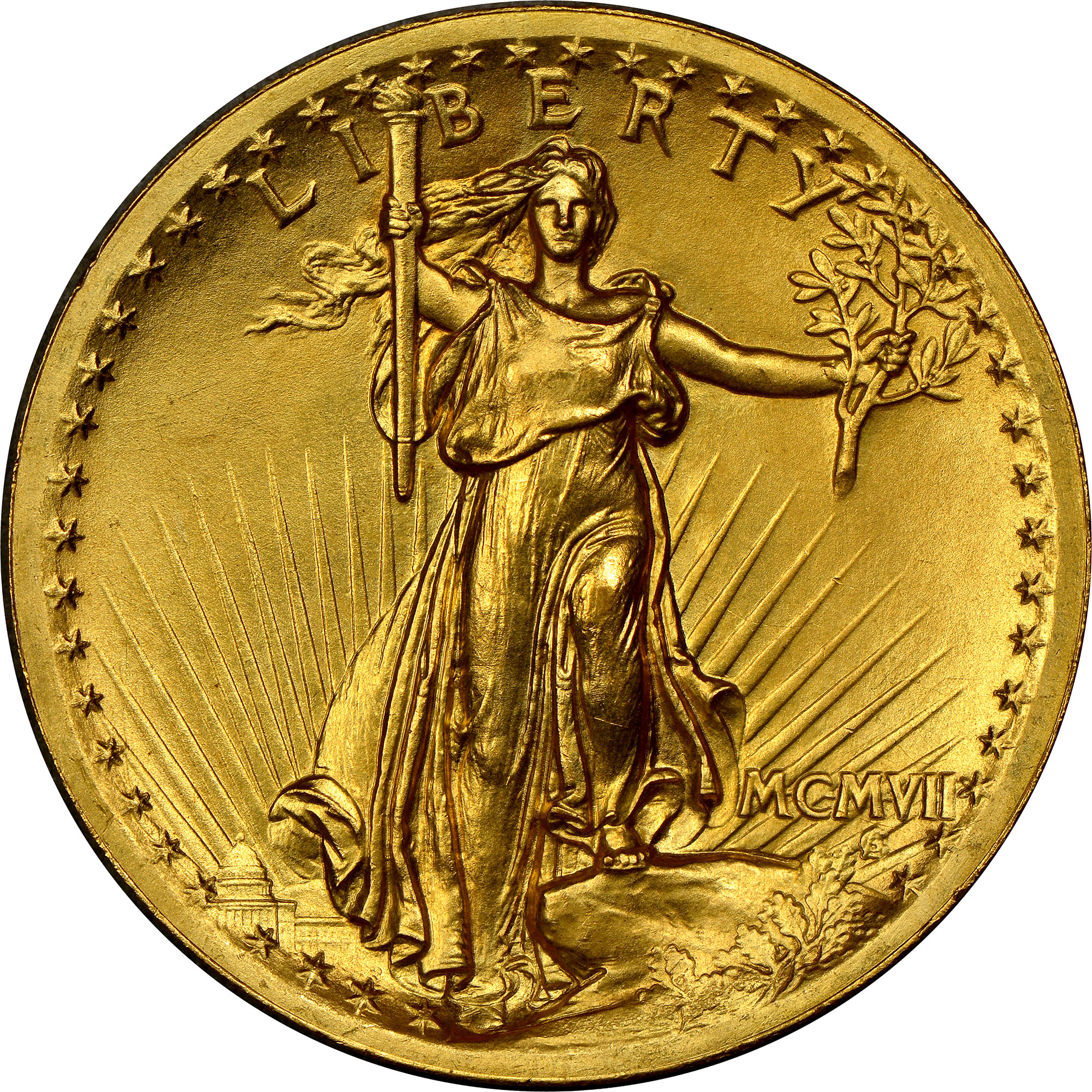
The goddess Liberty is portrayed on the high relief Double eagle (20 Dollars) coin of the United States of America, designed by Augustus Saint-Gaudens.

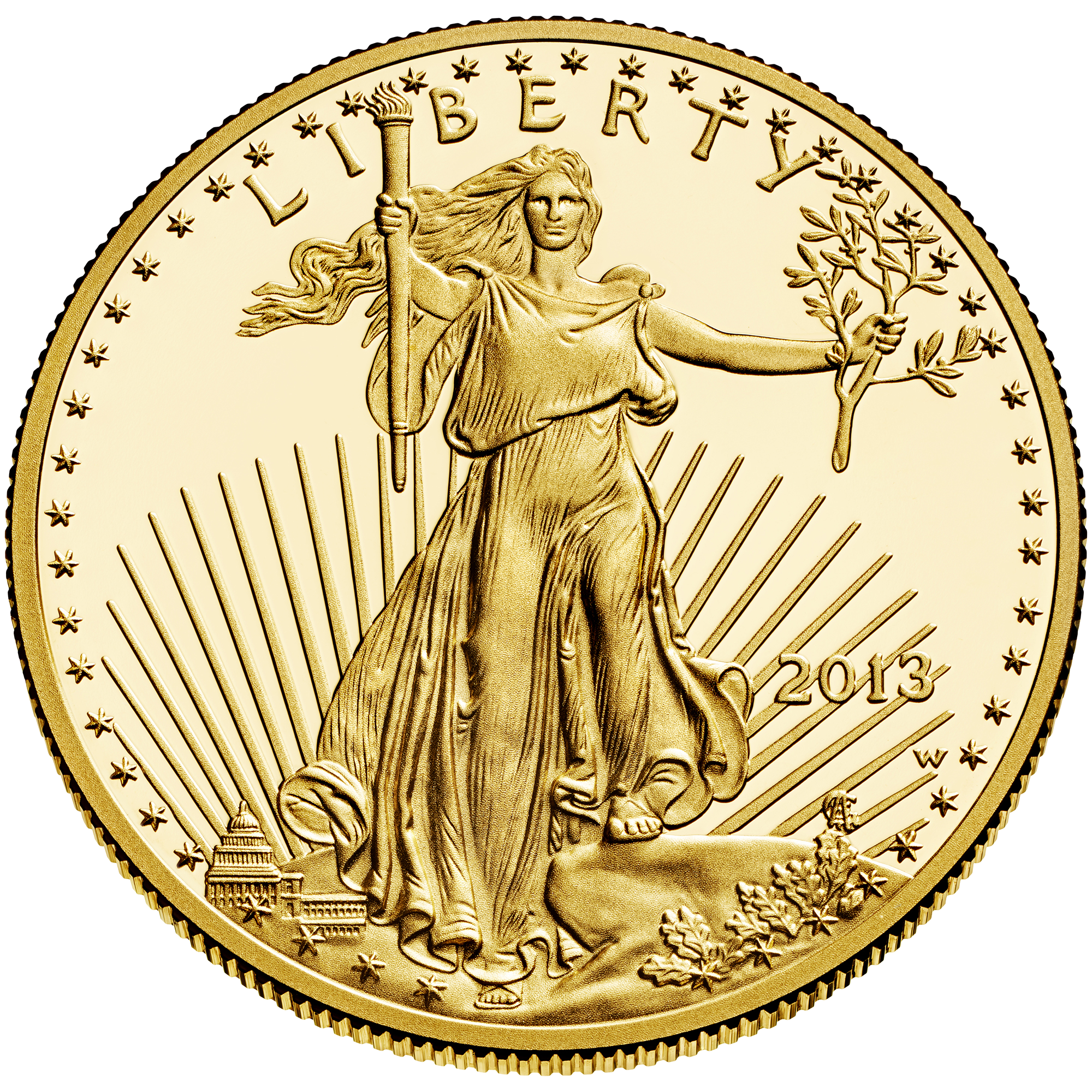
The obverse of the American Gold Eagle, a gold bullion coin in current production, designed by Saint-Gaudens

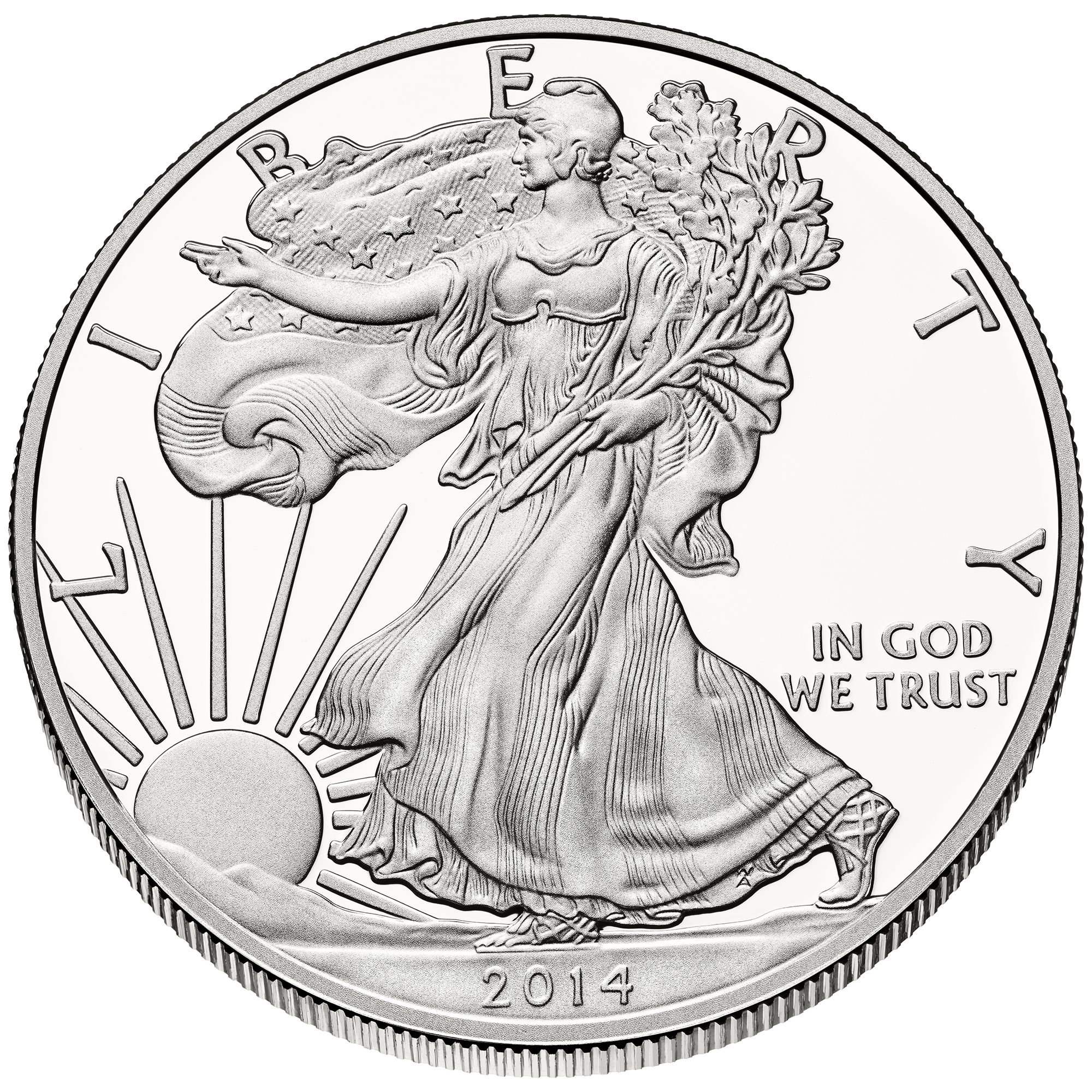
The obverse of the American Silver Eagle, a silver bullion coin in current production, from a design by Adolph A. Weinman

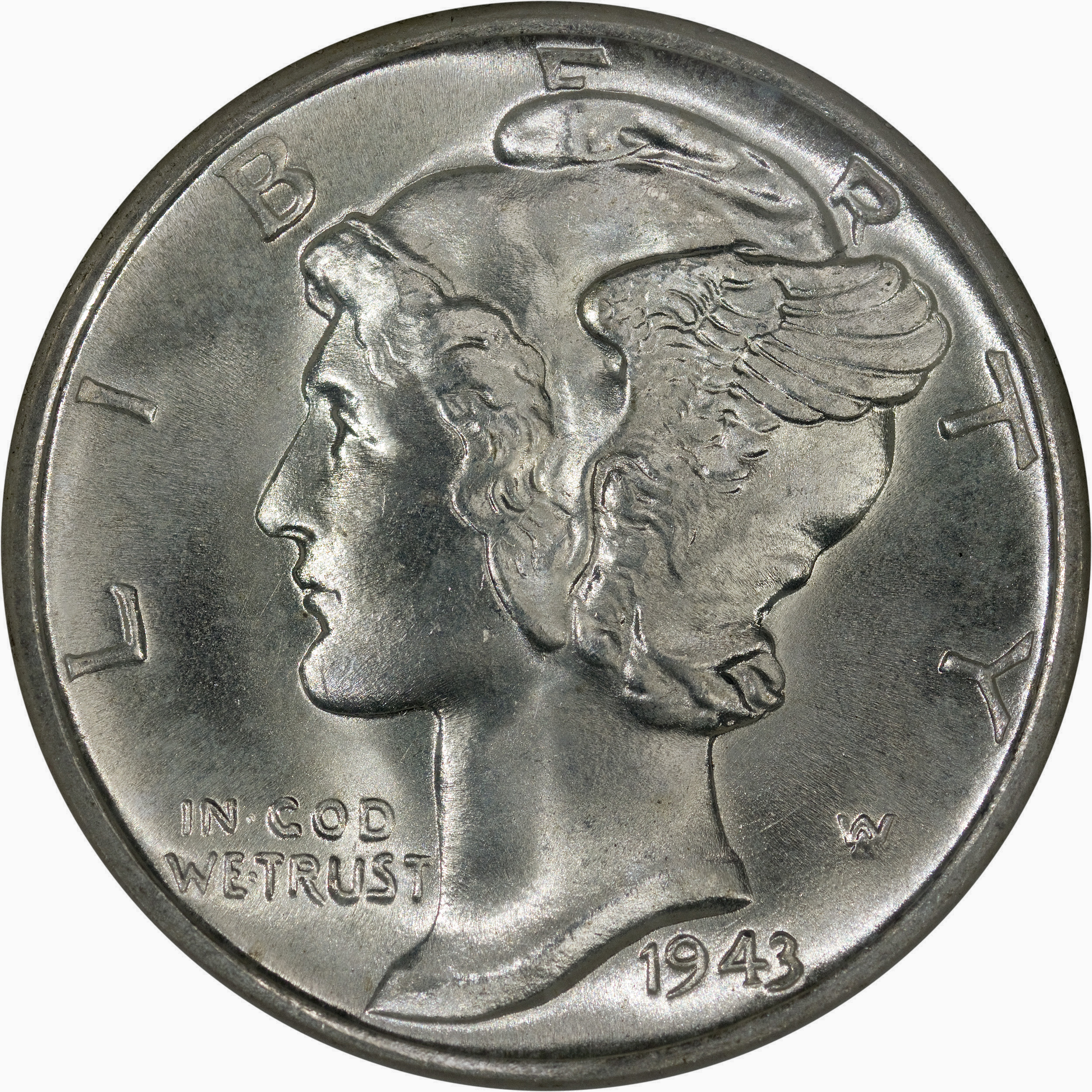
A young Liberty, with winged cap, on the Obverse of the Winged Liberty Head dime, which became (incorrectly) known as the Mercury dime, designed by Weinman and issued in the US between 1916 and 1945

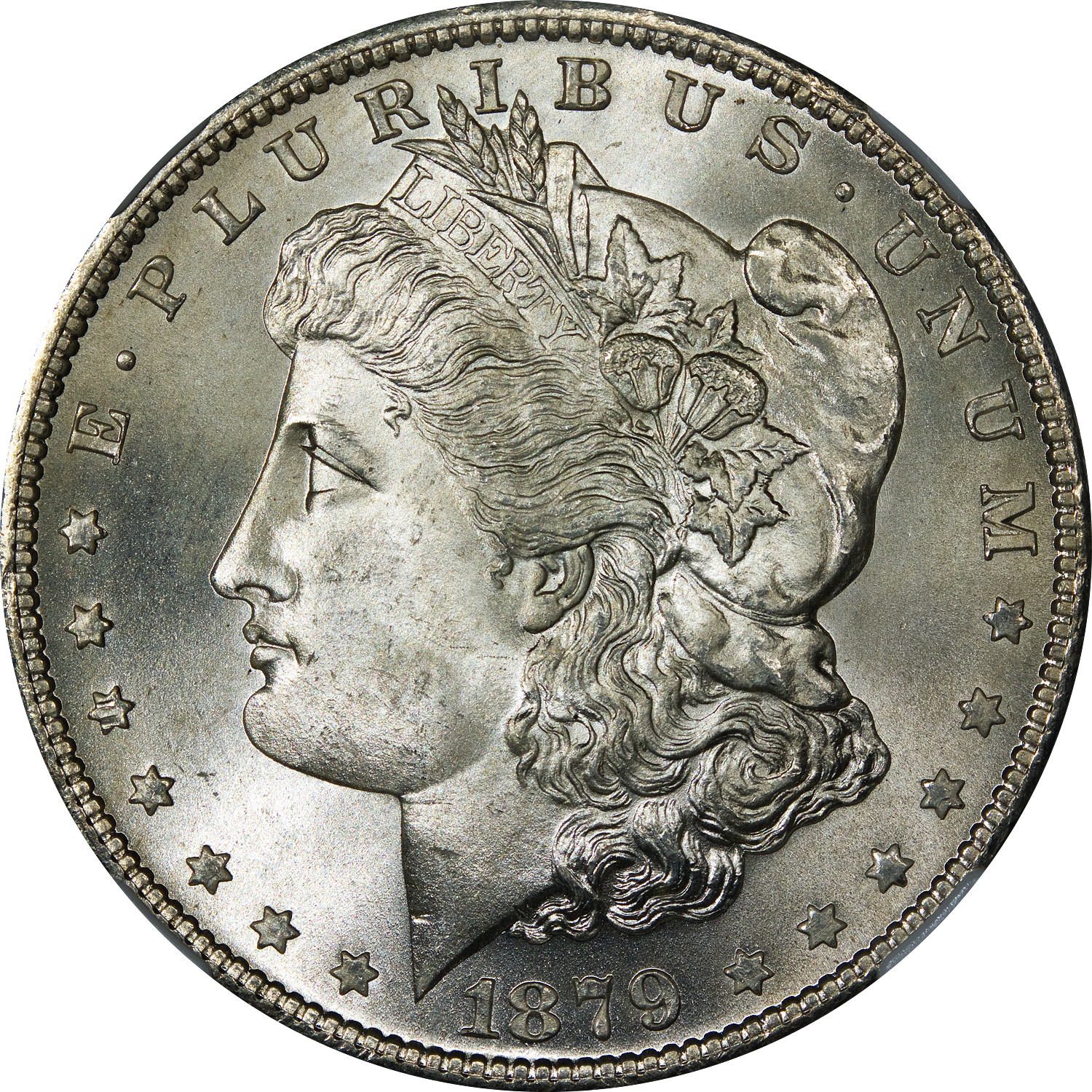
Liberty depicted wearing a Phrygian cap on the obverse of the Morgan silver dollar, designed by George T. Morgan

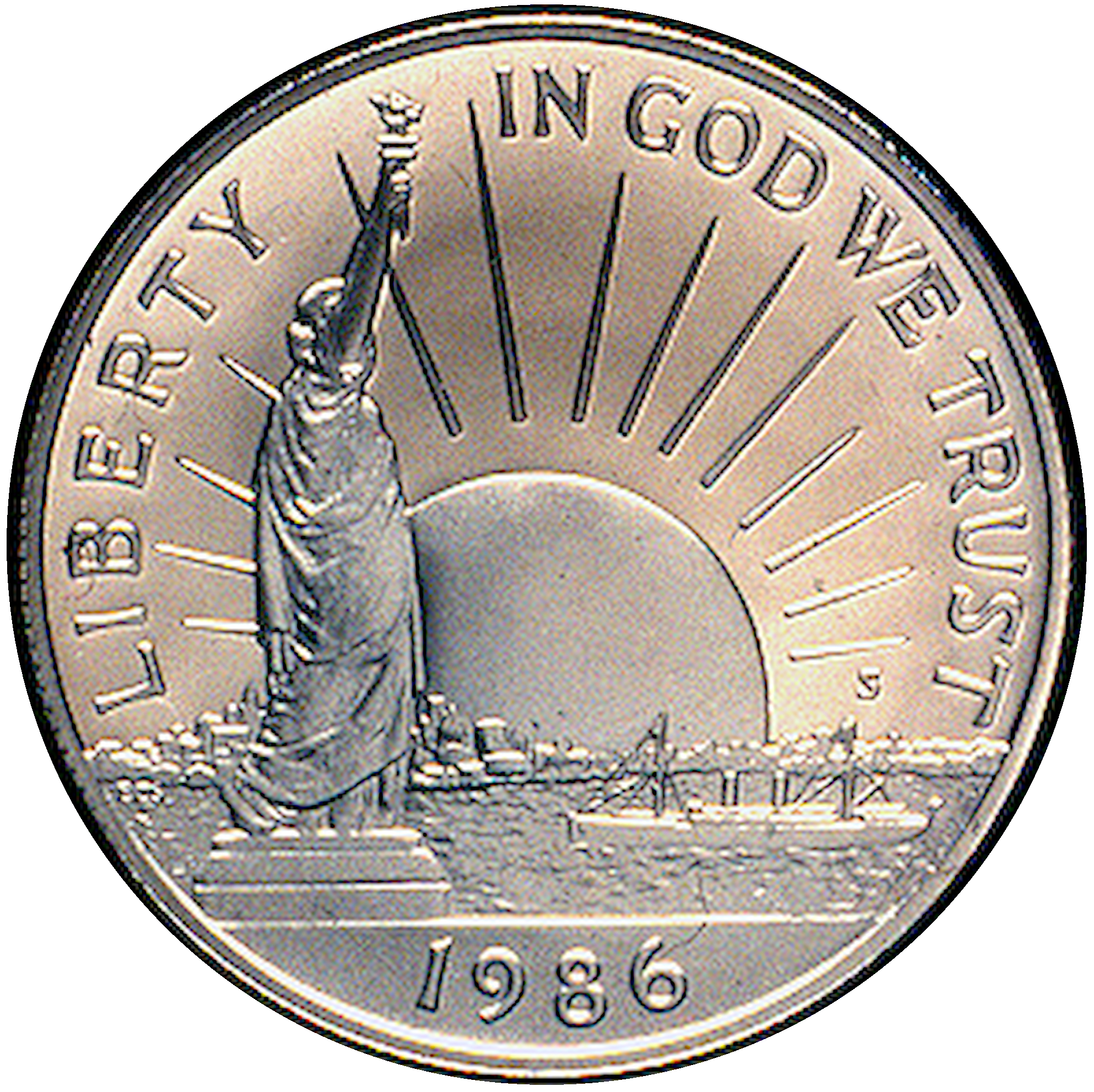
Liberty Enlightening the World depicted on the obverse of its 1986 100th anniversary Statue of Liberty commemorative half-dollar

== See also ==
- Columbia (name)
- Freedom Monument
- George-Étienne Cartier Monument
- Goddess of Democracy
- Great Seal of France
- Liberty Displaying the Arts and Sciences
- Monument of Liberty (disambiguation)
- Strengthen the Arm of Liberty
- We Owe Allegiance to No Crown
- Kandaka of the Sudanese Revolution
