= Great Seal of France =

Obverse (left) and reverse (right) side of the great seal, adopted in 1848; 178 years ago. The headdress of the Liberty featured on the obverse side is similar to that of the Statue of Liberty (Liberty Enlightening the World), which would be offered by the French people to the U.S. 40 years later. Both are republican symbols.

The Great Seal of France (French: Grand sceau de France) is the seal of the French Republic. After the 1792 revolution established the First French Republic, the insignia of the monarchy was removed from the seal. Over time, the new seal changed. At first, it featured Marianne, symbol of the revolution. It evolved to show that the people developed their culture and politics. In modern times, it depicts Liberty, along with aspects of culture such as art, education, and agriculture.

== Description ==
The Great Seal features Liberty, wearing a crown with seven arches. She holds a fasces and is supported by a ship's tiller with a cock carved or printed on it, representing the Gallic rooster (le coq gaulois), a symbol of the Gauls and early French nation. At her feet is a vase with the letters "SU" ("Suffrage Universel", "Universal suffrage"). At her right, in the background, are symbols of the arts (painter's tools), architecture (Ionic order), education (burning lamp), agriculture (a sheaf of wheat) and industry (a cog wheel). The scene is surrounded by the legend "RÉPUBLIQUE FRANÇAISE, DÉMOCRATIQUE, UNE ET INDIVISIBLE" ("French Republic, democratic, one and indivisible") and "24 FEV.1848" (24 February 1848) at the bottom.

The reverse bears the words "AU NOM DU PEUPLE FRANÇAIS" ("in the name of the French people") surrounded by a crown of oak (symbol of perennity and justice) and laurel (symbol of glory) leaves tied together with wheat and grapes (agriculture and wealth), with the circular national motto "LIBERTÉ, ÉGALITÉ, FRATERNITÉ".

== History ==
=== Pre-Revolution ===
The first seals were created by the Merovingian kings to authenticate their orders. Merely rings originally, later worn on a necklace, the royal seals grew bigger and bigger under the House of Capet to reach around 12 cm (4.7 in). These are the modern dimensions of the seal.

All the seals under the Ancien Régime featured the king sitting on this throne and giving justice, yet every king had his own personal seal, a unique item which passed with him. All edicts, orders, decrees and declarations were then sealed.

=== Revolutionary period ===
On August 13, 1792, representatives of the National Convention arrested King Louis XVI. He was imprisoned, and later executed on January 21, 1793. This act of regicide demonstrated that "the Convention had irreversibly ruled out any compromise with the Revolution's opponents." With the absence of the king, the French Republic sought a new national symbol. It was from these tumultuous times that the French symbol of Marianne emerged. The French Revolution not only challenged the political authority of the Old Regime led by the monarchy; it also challenged the traditional symbols that had thus far defined the French people. Anthropologists have argued that every society needs a "center" which includes social and political mapping that gives the people a sense of their place. In the traditional model of authority, "the king was the sacred center and culture was firmly fixed in the longstanding notions of a catholic hierarchical order." By de-centering this frame of traditional authority while overthrowing the monarchy, revolutionaries realized that the cultural framework of the past could not be carried into the future, and that the use of the king as the insignia of the seal had to be replaced with a new seal signifying the Republic. Revolutionaries began iconoclastically destroying tangible reminders of the Old Regime, such as breaking the seals of royalty, the scepter and the crown and melting them into republican coins.

The abolition of royalty, however, led to questions about the importance of having a unified symbol. In the beginning, seals were only used to compensate for the imperfection of writing. Yet as Henri Grégoire argued, civilized people found that "a sign, a type, was necessary to give character to authenticity" to all public acts. The nation would only be recognizable by its public symbolic representation, and hence it was agreed that a new seal of state would be created to give the new republic a sense of permanence. The seal was not only a representation of public authority, but it signified the new republican mold. As Lynn Hunt puts it, "new symbols could make new men." The French Revolution stood for the notion that members of a society could invent culture and politics for themselves. As the National Convention worked to unify the Republic after the fall of the monarchy, the process to declare a national symbol became more urgent. In the end, "the choice of a new insignia seemed almost automatic." In order to dispel all traces of monarchical influence, the members of the National Convention "proposed the choice of Liberty." The choice was a clear one and deputies of the Convention like Abbe Grégoire proposed that the Republic's image should be "Liberty, 'so that our emblem, circulating all over the globe, should present to all peoples the beloved image of Republican liberty and pride.'" This notion of Liberty is, in a sense, "the very essence of the Republic."

Liberty was officially represented by the female figure of Marianne, which adheres to traditional iconographic expectations. The Phrygian cap worn by this figure of liberty was representative of the inherent freedom of the French people and provided a sharp contrast to the crown of the monarchy. According to Maurice Agulhon, an expert on this particular symbol of the French Revolution, Marianne "represented both Liberty, an eternal value, and at the same time the newly constituted regime of the French Republic." She was depicted as "a woman holding a stave surmounted by a cap and trampling a yoke underfoot; this is the emblem that the ancients gave to Liberty won through valor." The feminine civic allegory of Marianne was distant from the controversial personalities of National Convention; therefore, Marianne's "abstraction and impersonality" allowed the symbol to endure the different phases of the Revolution. In addition, Marianne's close resemblance to the Catholic figure of Mary created unity between the rational revolutionaries and the devout peasantry. The emblem of Marianne was not only widely accepted, but also widely diffused in France. However, as the Revolution radicalized in 1793 with the rise of the Committee on Public Safety, the emblem of Marianne was replaced by a far more formidable symbol of the Revolution: Jacques-Louis David's statue of Hercules.

=== Post-Revolution ===
Napoleon, Louis XVIII, and Charles X all used monarchical seals like the Old Regime, Louis Philippe I used one showing only his bust.

The present seal dates back to the Second Republic, which briefly used the seals of the First Republic before having a new design made by the artist Jacques-Jean Barre on the 8 September 1848.

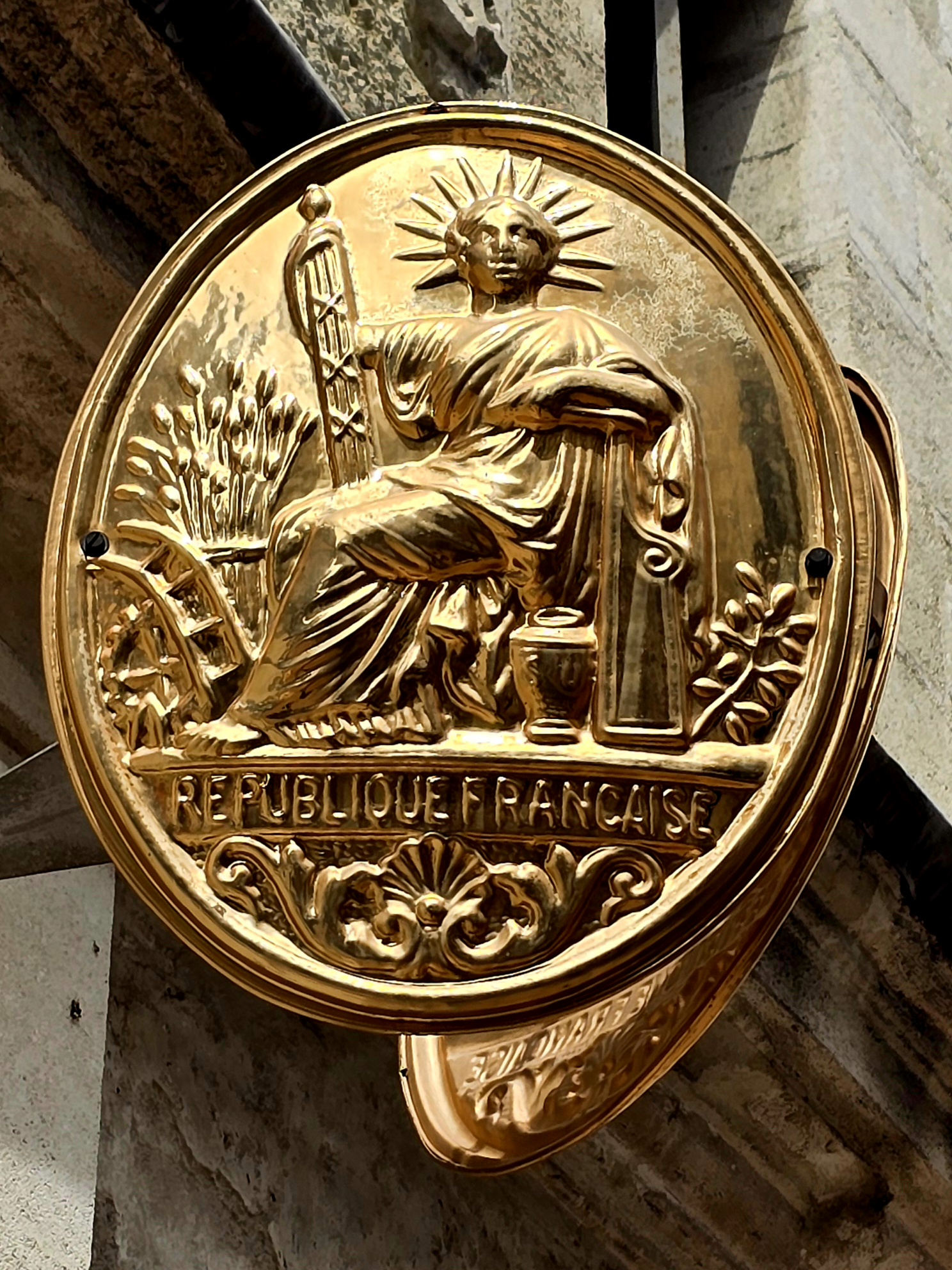
Notary's offices in France are identified by a plaque bearing a simplified version of the seal's obverse.

== Usage ==
Under the Second Republic, usage of the Great Seal of France tended to be reduced to sealing laws, decrees of the National Assembly and diplomatic treaties. The function of Keeper of the seals was officially linked to that of Minister of Justice at that time (the French Minister of Justice is popularly referred to "Le Garde des Sceaux").

After the Second Empire, the practice of applying seals to laws was gradually abandoned and restricted to constitutional acts and diplomatic treaties (for instance, the Treaty of Versailles was sealed in this way).

Under the Fourth Republic, the only document to be sealed was the Constitution of October 27, 1946.

Since the Fifth Republic, after sealing the Constitution of October 4, 1958, it became common practice to seal some constitutional modifications. Used in 1946, and twice at the beginning of the Fifth Republic, the sealing ceremonies became much less common from 1963 to 1991 period when only two laws – ordinary, but of great symbolic importance – were sealed. Since 1992, the pace of ceremonies has increased again: the constitutional changes since then were often the subject of a seal.

The date of the ceremony was very close to the date of passage of the law until 1964. It was subsequently clearly separated from the vote and publication of the text. An extreme case consists in the Constitutional Law no. 99-569 of July 8, 1999 on equality between women and men, sealed March 8, 2002, two and a half years after the entry into force of the law.

Sealing ceremonies are always held at the Chancellerie where the Keeper of the Seals, the Minister of Justice, holds a sealing press affixed to a best and the unique matrices of the Seal of the State.

== Sealing documents ==
=== Sealing wax ===
Originally, sealers used a plastic sealing wax which they shaped by hand into generally circular pieces which were definitely shaped by a press.

Nowadays, a liquid wax is fed directly into the inferior part of a shape made of a stamp and a mobile metallic ring; the shape is closed and the wax cools down until it becomes pasty before it is applied.

Usage of the Great Seal having become obsolete between 1920 and 1946, the recipe for the wax was lost. In 1946, trials had to be made by the Sigillographic service of the National Archives.

=== Color ===
The Ancien Régime used a green wax for important documents, and a yellow for less important ones.

The Restoration, the July Monarchy and the Third Republic kept the yellow wax, while the First Republic, the Consulate and the Empire used a red wax.

The Constitution of 1946 is sealed with red wax. The Constitution of 1958 and subsequent documents were sealed with yellow wax, until 2002 when green was again used.

=== Ribbons ===
The Empire sealed on wide yellow and blue silk ribbons; the Republic and the Consulate, on a tricolor braid.

The Third Republic used the same red and green ribbon as the Monarchy. Since 1946 (the Fourth and Fifth Republics), a tricolor ribbon is in use.

== Bibliography ==
- Agulhon, Maurice. Marianne into Battle: Republican Imagery and Symbolism in France 1789-1880. Cambridge: Cambridge University Press, 1981.
- Bourgin (Georges), Introduction à l'état sommaire des versements faits aux archives nationales par les ministères et les administrations qui en dépendant (série BB Justice), t. IV, lxxxxiii pages, Paris, Didier, 1947.
- Les constitutions de la France, 1791-1992. Exposition réalisée par le Ministère de la Justice et l'association « Expo 200 », Paris, 6 novembre-31 décembre 1992.
- Durand-Barthez (Pascal), Histoire des structures du Ministère de la Justice, 1789-1945, Paris, Presses universitaires de France, 1973, 92 p. : 35-36.
- Durand-Barthez (Pascal), "Qu'est-ce que le Sceau de France", Histoire pour tous, n° 22, February 1962.
- Guillaume (Marc), "Le Sceau de France, titre nobiliaire et changement de nom", paper delivered at the Académie des sciences morales et politiques, www.asmp.fr.
- Hunt, Lynn. Politics, Culture, and Class in the French Revolution. Berkeley: University of California Press, 1984.
- Monnerie (Michel), "Sceller avec le grand Sceau de l'État. Mode d'emploi", Histoire de la Justice, 7, 1994, p. 199-207.
- Nave (Guilhem), Les textes constitutionnels de 1791 à 1995. Analyse technique des documents, Unpublished report, October 1996, 27 p. [to be consulted at the French Archives nationales].
- Nielen-Vandevoorde (Marie-Adélaïde), "Le sceau de la 5e République", Revue de l'AMOPA, 161, July 2003, p. 27 à 29.
- Popkin, Jeremy D. A Short History of the French Revolution. Boston: Prentice Hall, 2010.
- Rouvier (Louis), Les Sceaux de la Grande Chancellerie de France de 458 à nos jours, Marseille, imprimerie de la société du Petit Marseillais, 1935, 94 p. : 83-84. [About the great and the little seals of the third Republic].
- Rouvier (Louis), La Chancellerie et les Sceaux de France, Marseille, Imprimerie marseillaise-Moullot, 1950, 181 p. : p. 87-89.
- Vallet (J.), "Le Sceau de France", La Vie judiciaire, August, 14-20 1977, p. 5.
- Yvorel (Jean-Jacques), " 'Déritualisation' et désacralisation de l'audience du sceau (XVIIIe-XIXe siècles)", Le sanglot judiciaire, la désacralisation de la justice, VIIIe-XXe siècles, Séminaire de Royaumont sous la direction de Frédéric Chauvaud, Créaphis, 1999, p. 209-224.
