= Gubernaculum (classical) =

Rudder of an ancient ship

A gubernaculum in classical references describes a ship's rudder or steering oar. The English word government is related to the word. The Old English word governail and the Scots word gouernaill are both derived from it.

== Classical history ==
The ancient rudder's different parts were distinguished by the following names: ansa, the handle; clavus, the shaft; pinna, the blade. The famous ship Tessarakonteres or "Forty" is said to have had four rudders. In the Bible, Paul's ship, which was shipwrecked on Malta, had its rudders (plural) cut loose.

== Classical depiction ==
Various gods such as Tritons and Venus have been shown with a gubernaculum. It is most associated with Fortuna since, along with the cornucopia, it is an item that she is often depicted as holding. The corresponding Greek god Tyche is also regularly shown with a gubernaculum. There are abundant depictions of Fortuna holding the gubernaculum on coins, in paintings, on altars and statues or statuettes.

Fortuna is depicted on around 1000 different Roman coins usually holding a gubernaculum.

A sandstone statuette of Fortuna, the Roman god of luck, fate, fortune was found at Castlecary and can now be found at the Hunterian Museum in Glasgow, Scotland.

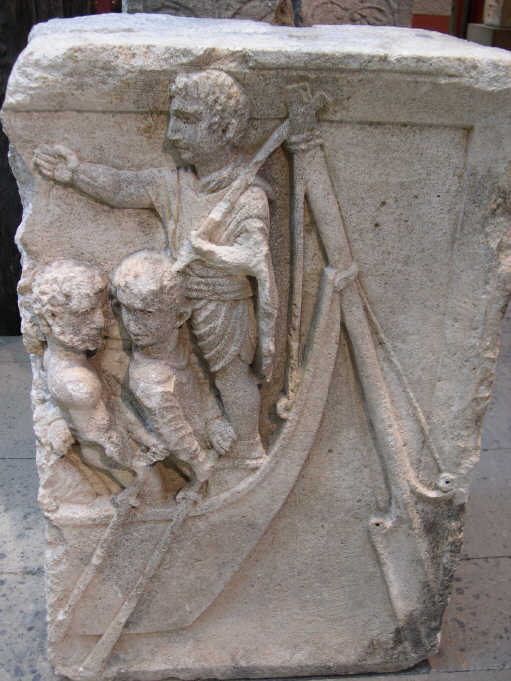
Rudder of a Roman Boat (Romano-Germanic Museum Cologne, Germany)

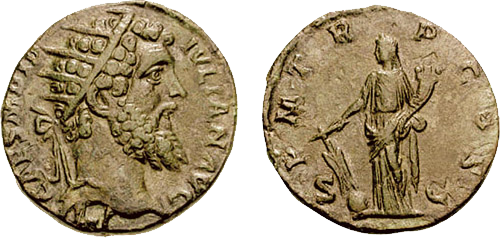
Dupondius Fortuna with gubernaculum

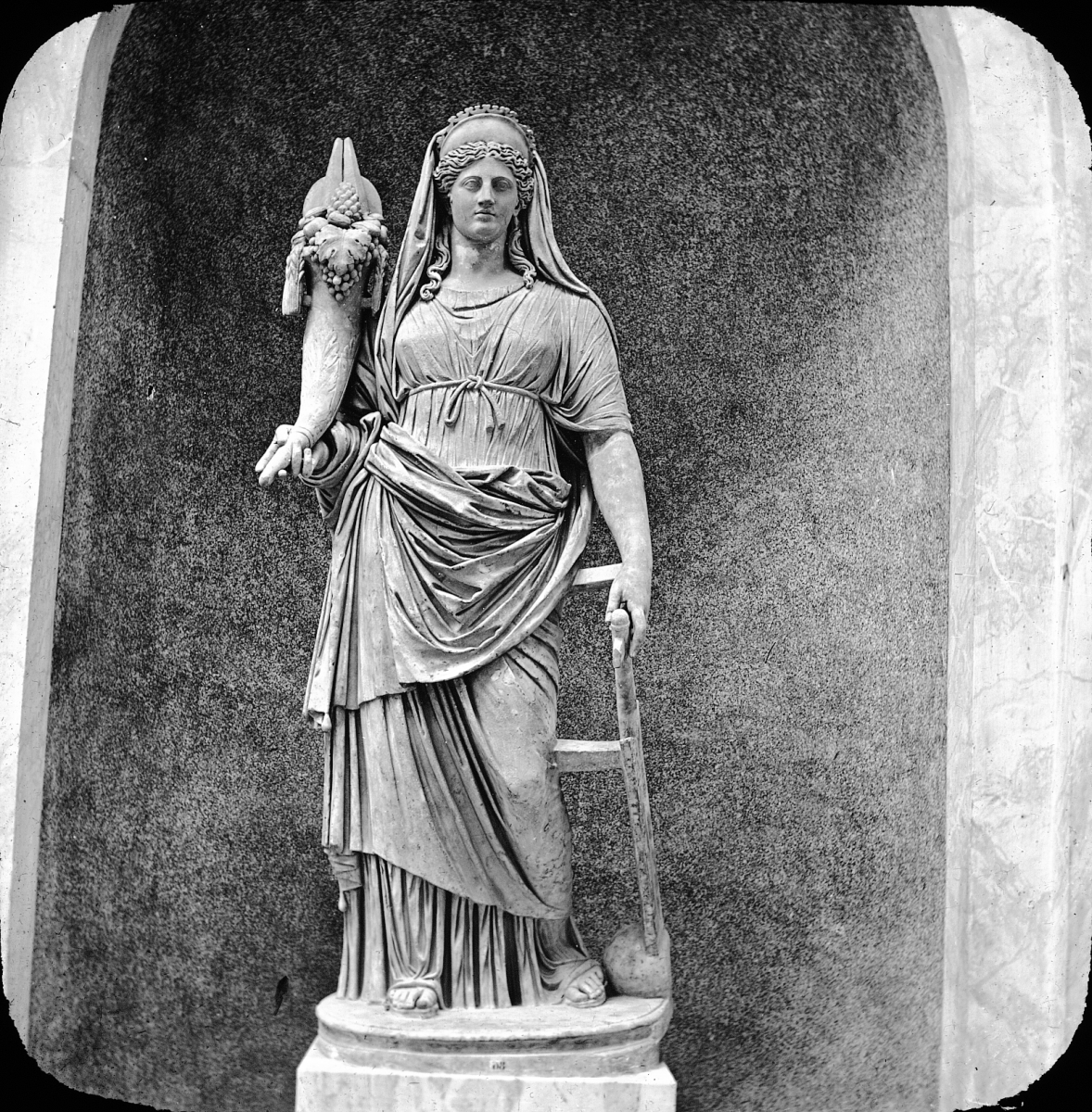
Vatican statue of Fortuna steering with her gubernaculum

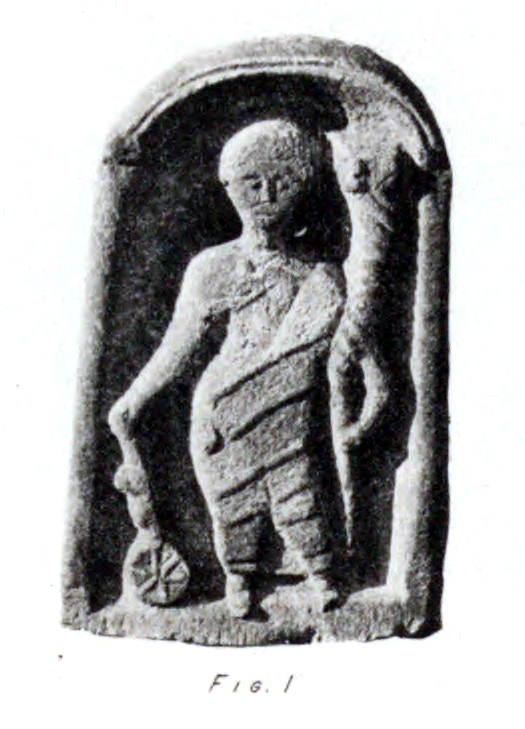
Statuette of the Roman goddess Fortuna, with gubernaculum (ship's rudder), Rota Fortunae (wheel of fortune) and cornucopia (horn of plenty) found near the altar at Castlecary in 1771.

== Symbolism and meaning ==
In mythology the rudder, which the goddess can steer, represents control of the changeable fortunes of life. Plato used the metaphor of turning the Ship of State with a rudder. In the Biblical book of James, the author compares the tongue with a ship's rudder which, though physically small, makes great boasts.

== See also ==
- Gubernaculum mammalian anatomy
- Gubernaculum nemitode
