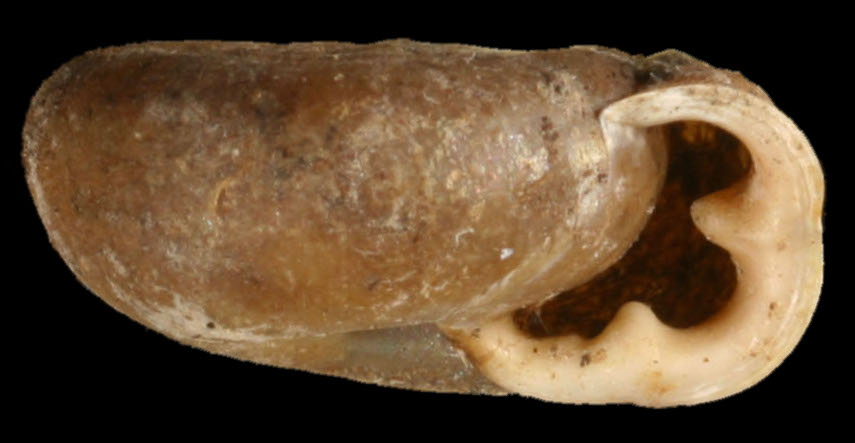
- Apertural view of the shell of Causa holosericea

Scientific classification
- Kingdom: Animalia
- Phylum: Mollusca
- Class: Gastropoda
- Order: Stylommatophora
- Superfamily: Helicoidea
- Family: Helicidae
- Subfamily: Ariantinae
- Genus: Causa; Schileyko, 1971

= Causa =

Genus of gastropods

Causa is a genus of air-breathing land snails, terrestrial pulmonate gastropod mollusks in the family Helicidae.

== Species ==
Species within the genus Causa include:

- Causa holosericea (S. Studer, 1820)
