= Standing Liberty quarter =

US 25-cent coin (minted 1916–1930)

- United States
- Value: 25 cents (.25 US dollars)
- Mass: 6.25 g
- Diameter: 24.3 mm
- Edge: reeded
- Composition: .900 silver, .100 copper
- Silver: .18084 troy oz
- Years of minting: 1916–1930
- Mint marks: D, S. Found immediately to the right of the lowest of the left-hand column of stars on the obverse (to the left of Liberty's feet.) Philadelphia Mint specimens lack mint mark.

Obverse
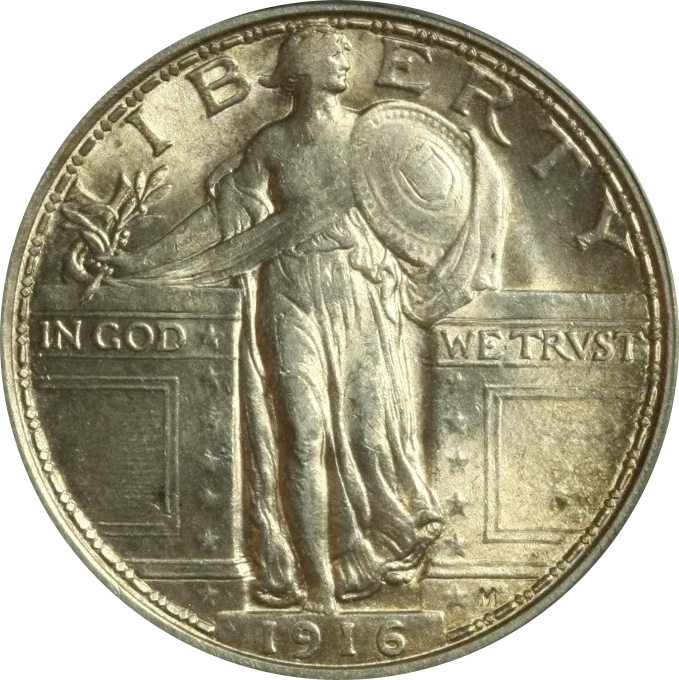
- Design: 1916 version
- Designer: Hermon MacNeil
- Design date: 1916
- Design discontinued: 1916
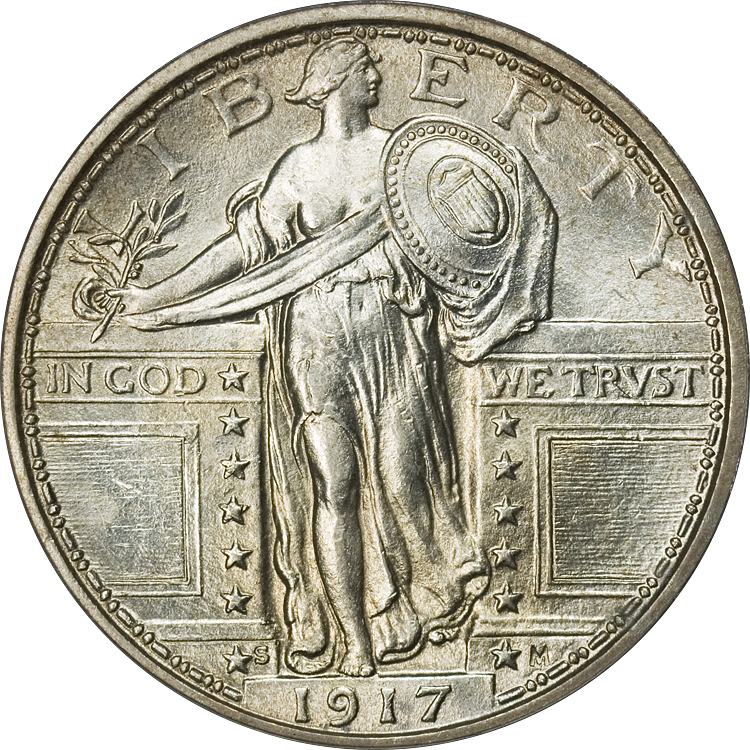
- Design: Type 1
- Designer: Hermon MacNeil
- Design date: 1917
- Design discontinued: 1917
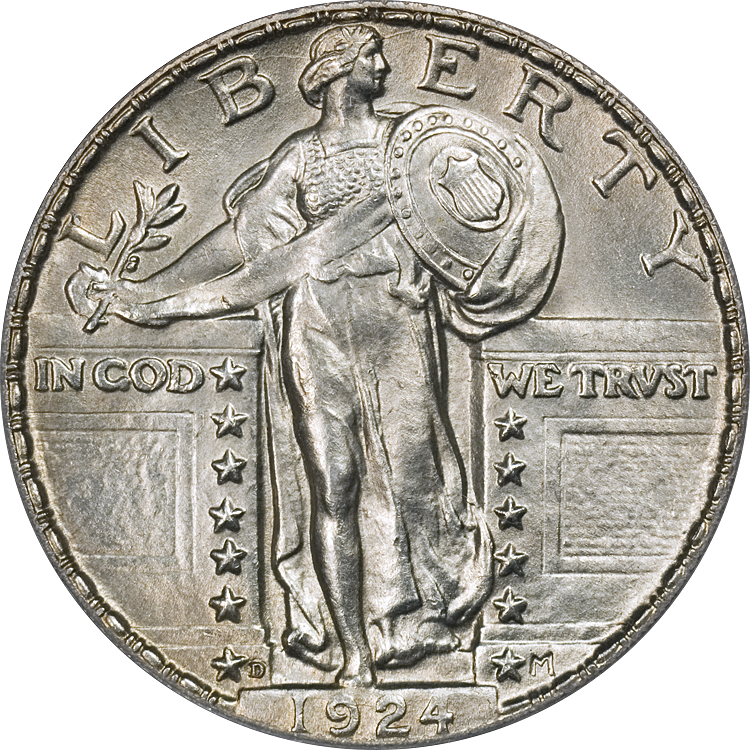
- Design: Type 2 or Type 2a
- Designer: Hermon MacNeil
- Design date: 1917
- Design discontinued: 1924
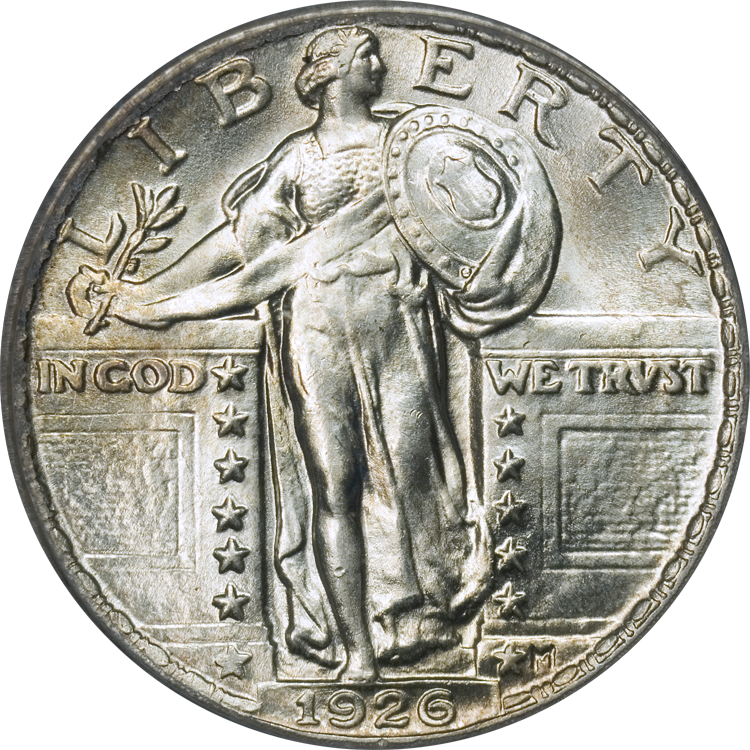
- Design: Type 3 or Type 2b
- Designer: Hermon MacNeil
- Design date: 1925
- Design discontinued: 1930

Reverse
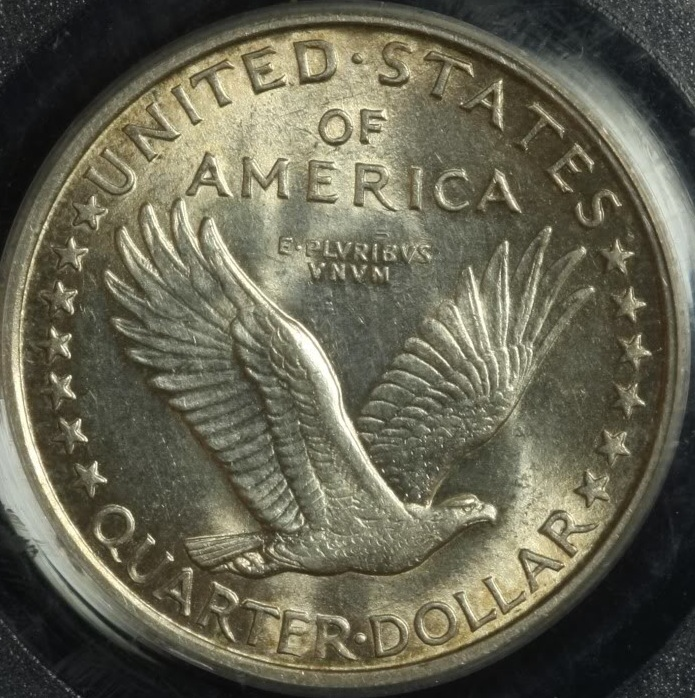
- Design: 1916 version
- Designer: Hermon MacNeil
- Design date: 1916
- Design discontinued: 1916
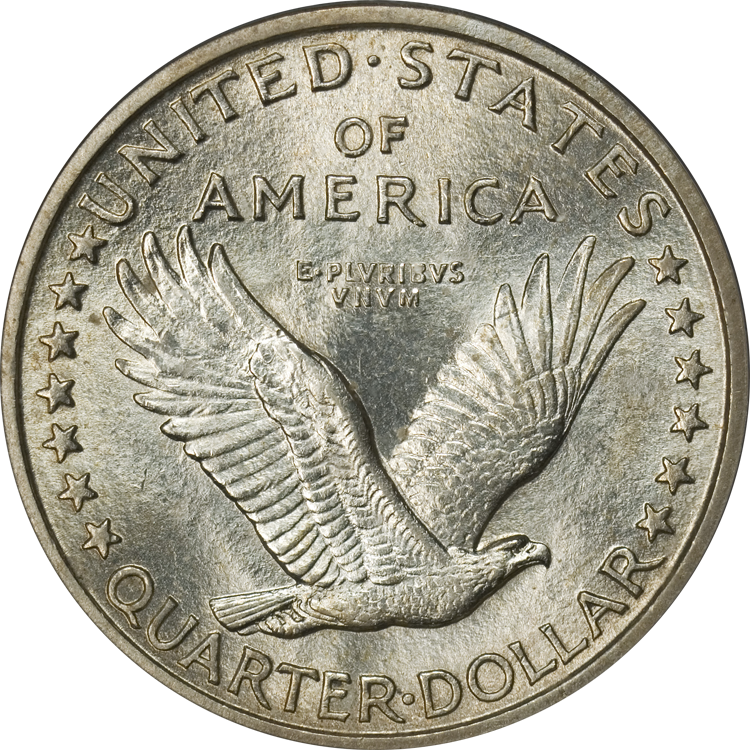
- Design: Type 1
- Designer: Hermon MacNeil
- Design date: 1917
- Design discontinued: 1917
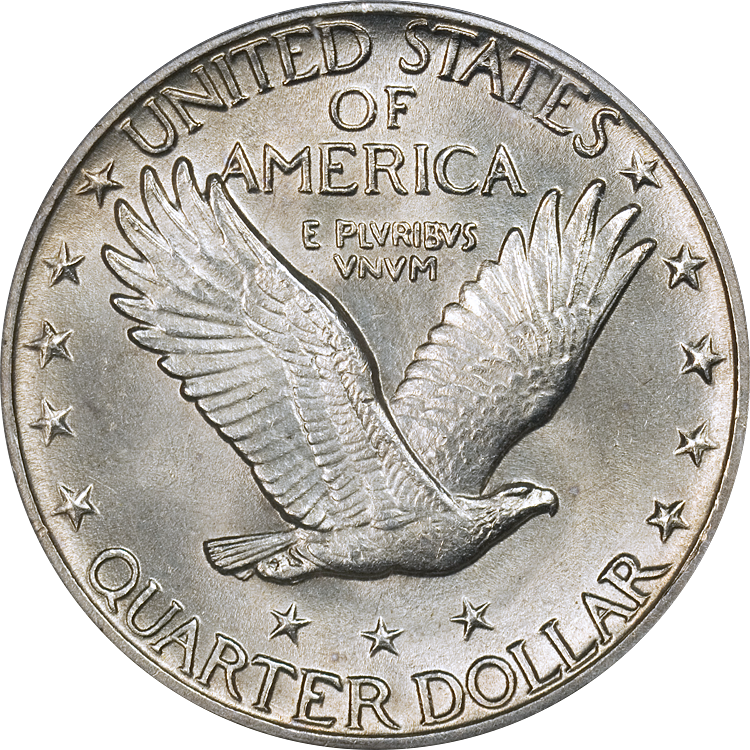
- Design: Type 2 and 3
- Designer: Hermon MacNeil
- Design date: 1917
- Design discontinued: 1930

The Standing Liberty quarter is a 25-cent coin that was struck by the United States Mint from 1916 to 1930. It succeeded the Barber quarter, which had been minted since 1892. Featuring the goddess of Liberty on one side and an eagle in flight on the other, the coin was designed by American sculptor Hermon Atkins MacNeil.

In 1915, Director of the Mint Robert W. Woolley began steps to replace the Barber dime, quarter, and half dollar, as he mistakenly believed that the law required new designs. MacNeil submitted a militaristic design that showed Liberty on guard against attacks. The Mint required modifications to the initial design, and MacNeil's revised version included dolphins to represent the oceans. In late 1916, Mint officials made major changes to the design without consulting MacNeil. The sculptor complained about the changes after receiving the new issue in January 1917. The Mint obtained special legislation to allow MacNeil to redesign the coin as he desired. One change made by the sculptor was the addition of a chain mail vest that covered Liberty's formerly bare breast.

In circulation, the coin's date wore away quickly, and Mint engravers modified the design in 1925 to address the issue. The Standing Liberty quarter was discontinued in 1931, a year in which no quarters were struck. By Congressional act the Washington quarter, featuring the first president's profile, was introduced in 1932 to celebrate the bicentennial of his birth.

== Inception ==
On September 26, 1890, the United States Congress passed an act providing:

The Director of the Mint shall have power, with the approval of the Secretary of the Treasury, to cause new designs ... to be prepared and adopted ... But no change in the design or die of any coin shall be made oftener than once in twenty-five years from and including the year of the first adoption of the design ... But the Director of the Mint shall nevertheless have power, with the approval of the Secretary of the Treasury, to engage temporarily the services of one or more artists, distinguished in their respective departments of art, who shall be paid for such service from the contingent appropriation for the mint at Philadelphia.

The Barber coinage had been introduced in 1892; dimes, quarter dollars, and half dollars with similar designs by Mint Chief Engraver Charles E. Barber. The Barber coinage, after its release, attracted considerable public dissatisfaction. Beginning in 1905, successive presidential administrations had attempted to bring modern, beautiful designs to United States coins. Following the redesign of the double eagle, eagle, half eagle and quarter eagle in 1907 and 1908, as well as the cent and nickel redesigns of 1909 and 1913 respectively, advocates of replacing the Barber coins began to push for the change when the coins' minimum term expired in 1916. As early as 1914, Victor David Brenner, designer of the Lincoln cent, submitted unsolicited designs for the silver coins. He was told, in response, that Secretary of the Treasury William G. McAdoo was completely occupied with other matters.

On January 2, 1915, an interview with Philadelphia Mint Superintendent Adam M. Joyce appeared in the Michigan Manufacturer and Financial Record:

So far as I know ... there is no thought of issuing new coins of the 50-cent, 25-cent, and 10-cent values. If, however, a change is made we all hope that more serviceable and satisfactory coins are produced than the recent Saint-Gaudens double eagle and eagle and the Pratt half and quarter eagle. The buffalo nickel and the Lincoln penny are also faulty from a practical standpoint. All resulted from the desire by the government to mint coins to the satisfaction of artists and not practical coiners.

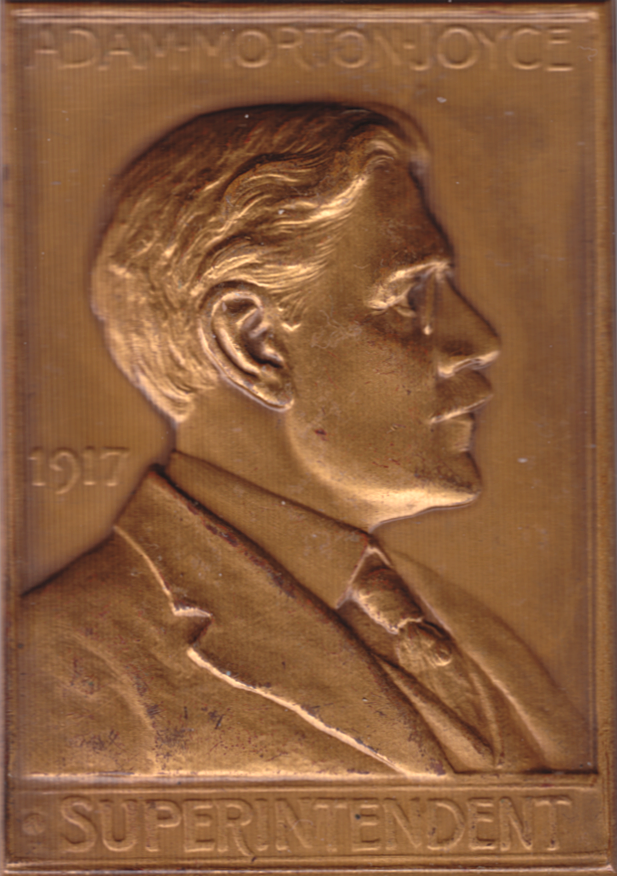
Philadelphia Mint Superintendent Adam M. Joyce decried the Lincoln cent and other new coinage, believing that they struck badly. Plaquette by George T. Morgan.

In January 1915, Assistant Secretary of the Treasury William P. Malburn sent McAdoo a memorandum about the silver subsidiary coinage, noting that "the present silver half dollar, quarter, and dime were changed in 1892, and a new design may, therefore, be adopted in 1916. This can be done any time in the year." In reply, McAdoo wrote "[l]et the mint submit designs before we try anyone else." on the memorandum.

In April 1915, Robert W. Woolley took office as Mint Director. On April 14, he asked Superintendent Joyce to request Chief Engraver Barber, then in his 36th year in office, to prepare new designs. The same day, Malburn requested the opinion of the Treasury Department's Solicitor concerning the Mint view that it could strike new designs for the three denominations in 1916. On April 17, the Solicitor's Office responded that the Mint could change the designs. At the time, the Mint was intensely busy producing the Panama-Pacific commemorative coin issue, and immediate action was not taken. In October, Barber was summoned to Washington to discuss coin designs with Woolley, though it is uncertain whether or not he had already prepared sketches for the new coinage.

On December 3, Woolley met with the Commission of Fine Arts. Woolley asked the Commission to view sketches produced by the Mint's engraving department. Barber was present to explain the coinage process to the Commission members. Woolley suggested to the members that if they did not like the Mint's work, they should select sculptors to submit designs for the new pieces. It was Woolley's intent to have distinct designs for the dime, quarter and half dollar—previously, the three pieces had been nearly identical. The director informed the Commission that as the existing coinage had been in use for 25 years, it would have to be changed—something which numismatic historian David Lange calls a "misinterpretation of the coinage laws".

The Commission disliked the sketches from the Mint (submitted by Barber) and selected sculptors Adolph Weinman, Hermon MacNeil and Albin Polasek to submit proposals for the new coins. The sculptors could submit multiple sketches. Although the Mint could decide to use a design on a denomination not intended by its sculptor, the designs were not fully interchangeable—by statute, an eagle had to appear on the reverse of the quarter and half dollar, but could not appear on the dime. Woolley hoped that each sculptor would be successful with one piece.

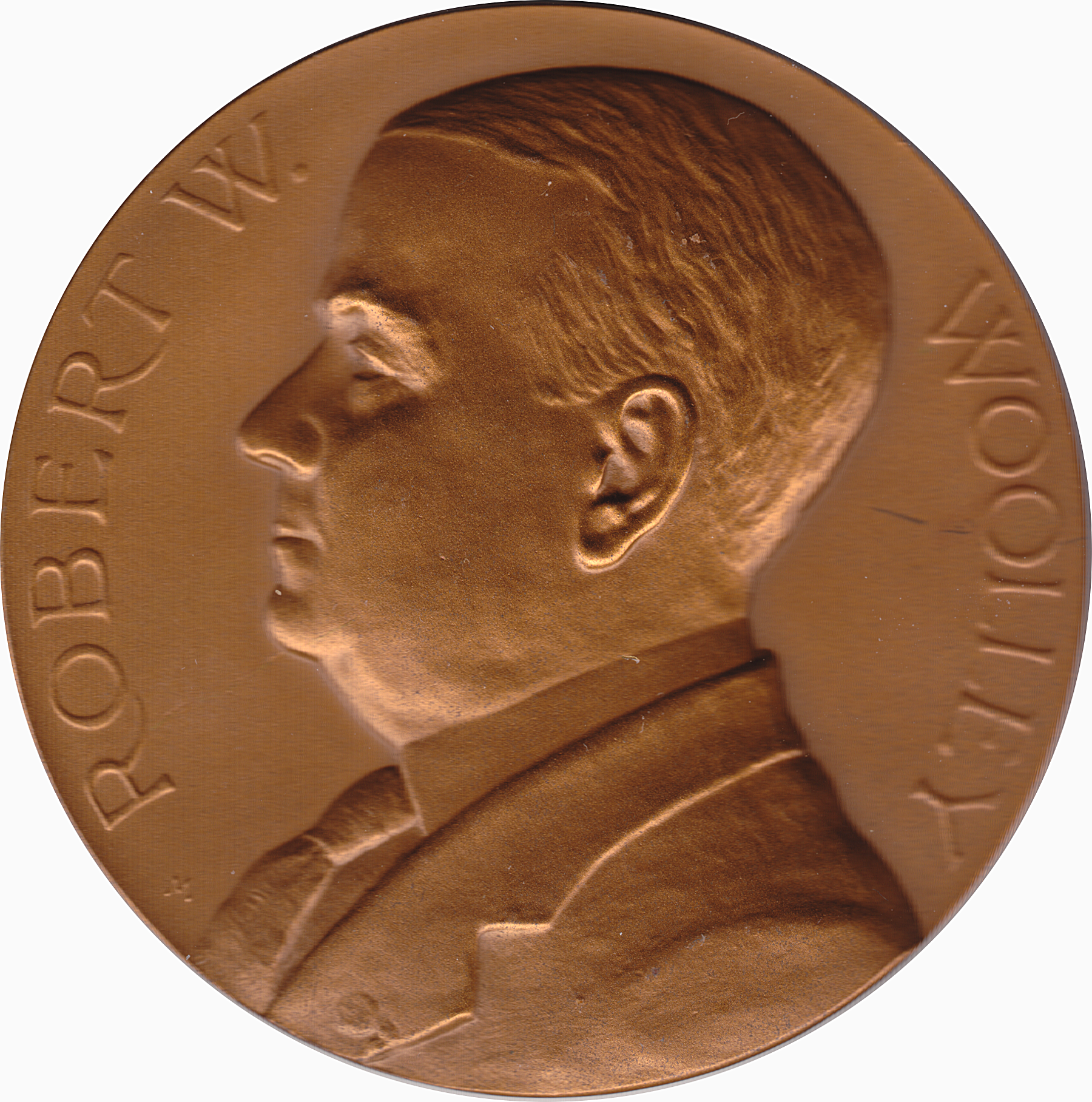
Mint Director Robert W. Woolley (seen on his Mint medal, designed by Assistant Engraver George T. Morgan) advocated for the end of the Barber coinage, though he may not have understood he did not have to replace them.

The three sculptors submitted design sketches in mid-February, and on February 23 met with Woolley in New York so the artists could make presentations of the work to him and answer his questions. After discussions between Woolley and McAdoo, Weinman was notified on February 28 that five of his sketches had been selected—for the dime and half dollar, and the reverse of the quarter. The same day, Woolley wrote to MacNeil to tell him he would sculpt the quarter's obverse, and to Polasek to inform him of his lack of success. Members of the Commission persuaded Woolley that so much should not be entrusted to a single artist, and MacNeil was allowed to design both sides of the quarter, subject to the sculptor producing a design satisfactory to Woolley.

On March 3, the new coins were publicly announced, with the Treasury noting, "[d]esigns of these coins must be changed by law every 25 years and the present 25 year period ends with 1916." The press release indicated that the Treasury hoped production of the new coins would begin in about two months, once the designs were finalized. The same day, Woolley wrote to Mint Engraver Barber, telling him that his sketches were rejected, and that models from Weinman and MacNeil would arrive at the Philadelphia Mint no later than May 1. According to numismatic historian Walter Breen, Barber became "sullen and totally uncooperative". Lange notes that "numerous delays were encountered as the artists fine-tuned their models while simultaneously avoiding obstacles thrown in their path by Barber. While his observations regarding many aspects of practical coinage were quite accurate, they clearly could have been presented in a more constructive manner." In his book on Mercury dimes, Lange notes that Barber, by then aged 75, had been "compelled over the past ten years to participate in the systematic undoing of a lifetime's achievements"; he had to participate in the process which resulted in coins designed by others replacing ones designed by him.

With the new pieces, all American coins would have had a recent change of design (the Morgan dollar was not then being struck). According to a column in The Art World magazine later in 1916,

Since that day [the 19th century] much artistic progress has taken place in our coinage. Sculptors of reputation have been employed with admirable results ...And now we are to have a new half dollar and a new dime by Weinman and a new quarter by McNeill [sic]. Altogether, in the retrospect, it seems an incredible achievement.

== Design ==
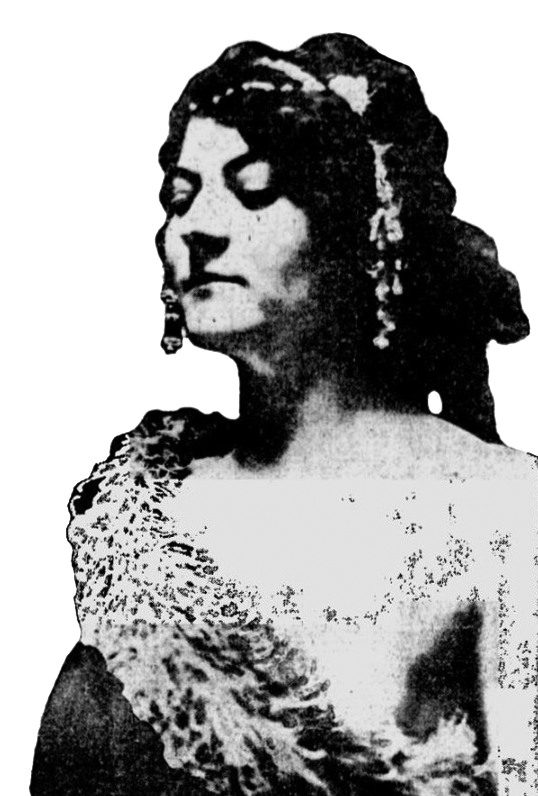
Doris Doscher, billed as "The Girl on the Quarter"

The identity of the model for the obverse of the quarter is uncertain. As early as May 1917, the model for the depiction of Liberty was reported to be Doris Doscher, who would later become a silent film actress under the name Doris Doree. This was accepted for many years. Doscher became well known as "the girl on the quarter"; she died in 1970 at age 88. In 1972, a quarter-century after MacNeil's death, newspapers reported that the actual model was Broadway actress Irene MacDowell, then aged 92 (she died the following year) whose name was said to have been concealed because her husband (one of MacNeil's tennis partners) disapproved. In an article in the December 2003 edition of The Numismatist, Timothy B. Benford Jr., suggests that the supposed deception was to fool MacNeil's wife, who saw MacDowell as a potential romantic rival. In 1982, Doscher's widower stated that despite the MacDowell claim, his wife had posed for the quarter.

MacNeil submitted two designs for the obverse, the one which was successful and another, showing a standing Liberty facing right, which he would later resubmit in modified form in the Peace dollar design competition of 1921, again unsuccessfully. In the rejected design, MacNeil's Liberty leans forward, an olive branch extended in her left hand, but her right hand holding the hilt of a broadsword. According to Burdette, the design was intended to send a message to the belligerents in World War I that America wanted peace, but was ready to fight.

MacNeil's accepted obverse is only slightly less militaristic; his Liberty faces to the viewer's right (heraldic east) in the direction of the European war, and her shield faces in that direction as well. She holds an olive branch as she strides through a gate in a wall which is inscribed, "In God We Trust", with the "U" in "Trust" shaped as a V. MacNeil stated that the obverse depicted Liberty "stepping forward in ... the defense of peace as her ultimate goal". According to art historian Cornelius Vermeule, "Liberty is presented as the Athena of the Parthenon pediments, a powerful woman striding forward" and states that, but for the Stars and Stripes on her shield, "everything else about this Amazon calls to mind Greek sculpture of the period between Pheidias to Praxiteles, 450 to 350 BC." MacNeil's Liberty was used as Columbia Pictures Corporation's first logo, from 1924 until 1927, though it was given longer hair.

Vermeule suggested that the flying eagle on the reverse is simply that of the 1836 Gobrecht dollar, seen flying from left to right instead of the opposite way, as on the earlier piece. He applauded the 1917 change to the reverse, feeling that it made it less cluttered. Vermeule noted that the reverse marked the beginning of the end (at least for that era) for naturalistic depictions of eagles on US coins, stating in 1970 that those after 1921 tended to present a heraldic appearance instead.

== Preparation ==
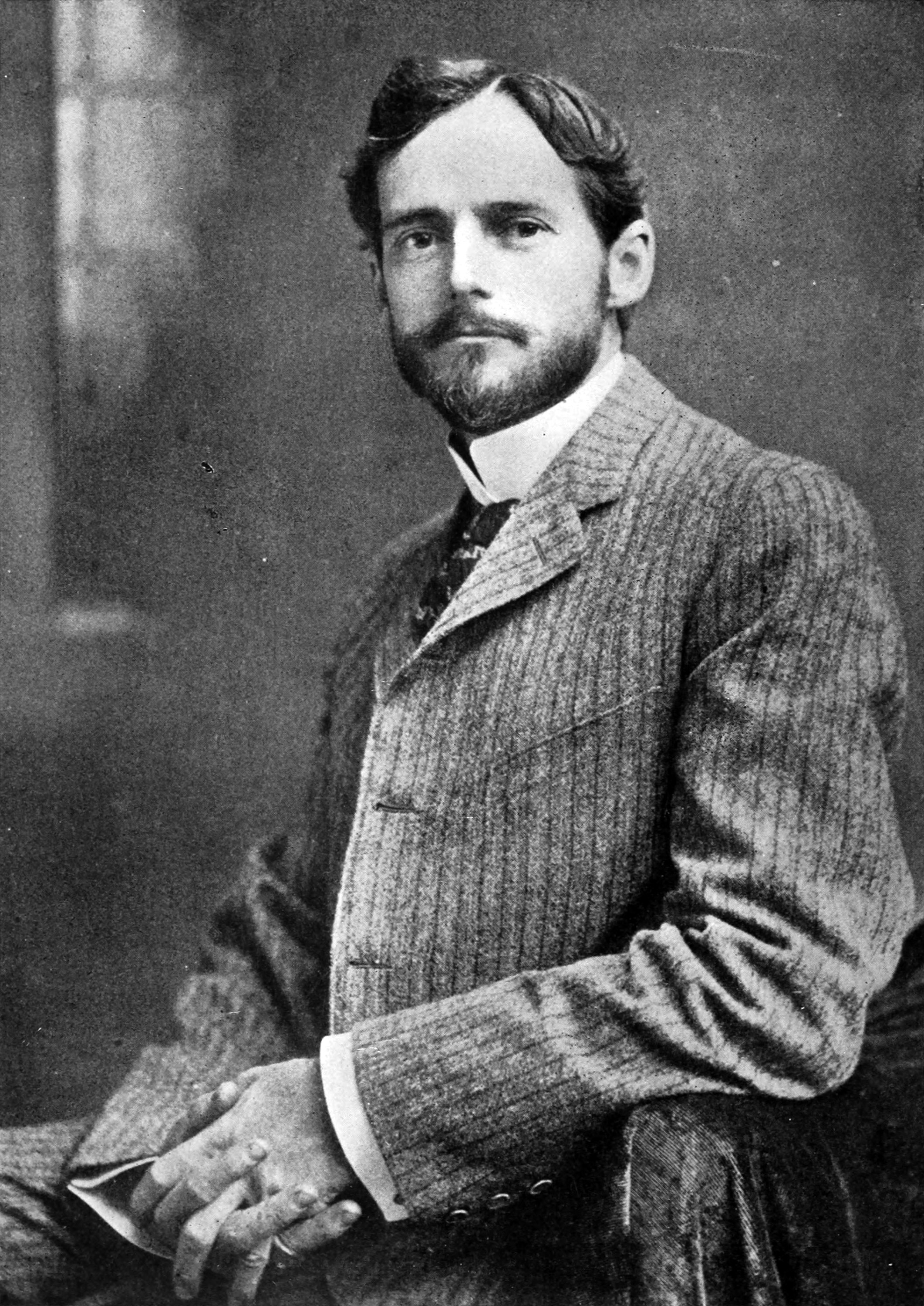
Hermon Atkins MacNeil

In a letter to Woolley, MacNeil had promised to "try and produce something that shall be of use to you". The sculptor had been awarded the reverse of the quarter only provisionally, and he prepared a series of studies for the reverse to show Woolley when he visited his studio in College Point, New York. At that time, Woolley selected a reverse similar to that eventually coined, showing an eagle in flight, wings extended and shown almost in full. Other designs which were shown to Woolley included similar eagle designs, but from different angles.

The Mint's original schedule called for the designers of the three new coins to complete their models by April 15, 1916. This would allow production of the new pieces to begin about July 1. However, the Mint quickly revised the submission deadline to May 1; this proved optimistic as MacNeil did not submit his models, in the form of bronze casts, until May 18. Even so, he was faster than Weinman, who did not ship the last of his casts to the Mint until June 6. Woolley formally approved the designs for the quarter by letter dated May 23, 1916. Despite the delays, the Mint attempted to meet the July 1 start date.

On June 21, Woolley wrote to Superintendent Joyce,

The model of the obverse on the half dollar will have to be made over and Mr. Weinman informs me he is now at work on it. The same is true of the quarter dollar. The reverse of both the quarter dollar and the half dollar, as shown on the coins struck from the polished dies, are satisfactory ... Everyone to whom the coins have been shown here thinks they are beautiful.

No records of Woolley's objections to the quarter's obverse are known to exist, but numismatic author Roger Burdette suggests that his major concern was that when experimental pattern coins were struck in June, the obverse was indistinct, making even brand new coins appear worn. MacNeil was given permission to do further work on his design by Woolley in late June, and in mid-August turned in a revised obverse different in detail from the original. "In God We Trust" was displayed on the sash which Liberty holds, a complex chain motif surrounded the design, and two dolphins, emblematic of the Atlantic and the Pacific Oceans, lay at Liberty's feet. Liberty's shield bore an eagle, rather than the Stars and Stripes. Treasury Secretary McAdoo immediately approved the design changes, acting on August 19.

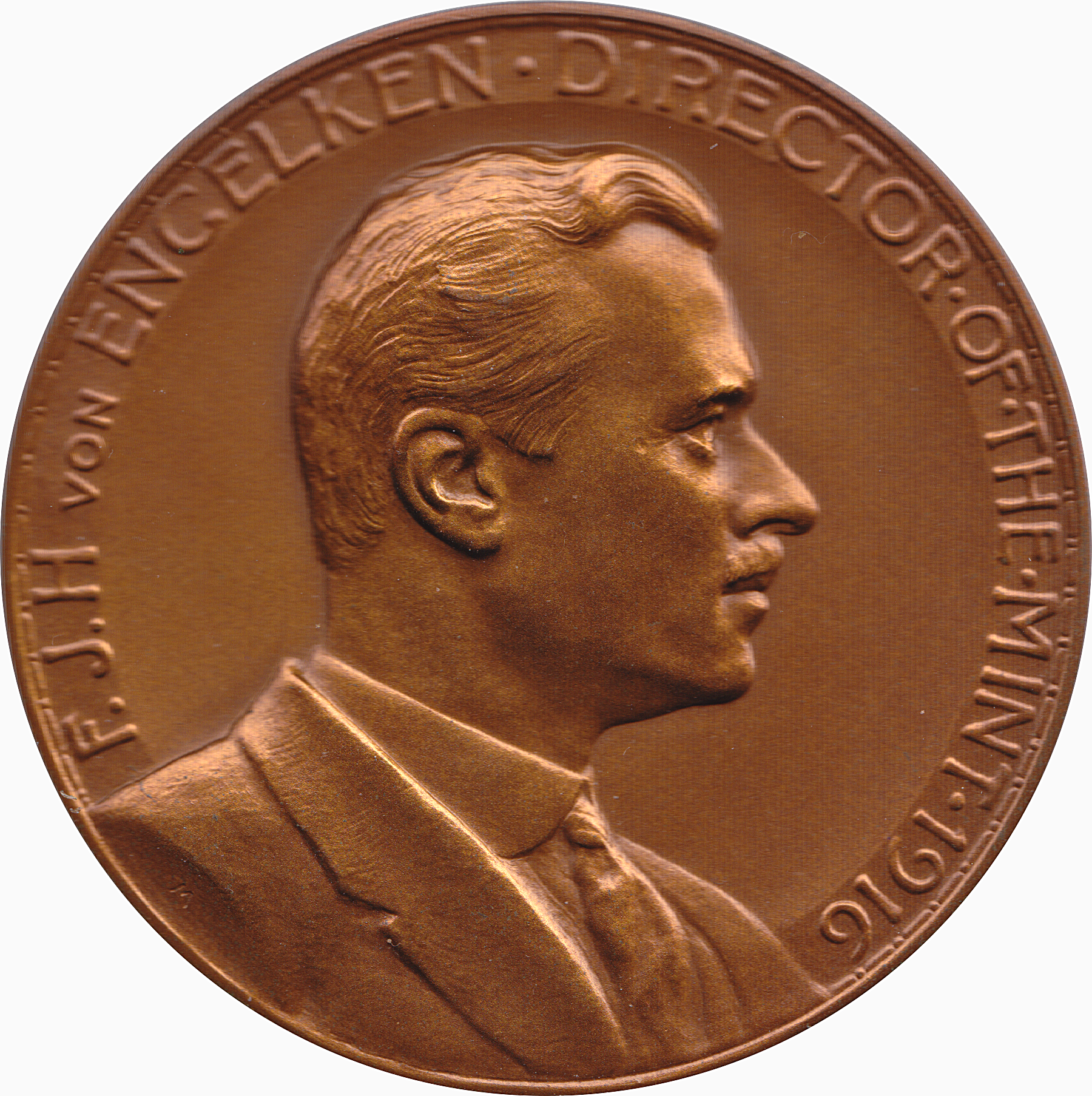
Mint Director Friedrich Johannes Hugo von Engelken. There were problems with the Standing Liberty quarter throughout his six-month tenure as Mint Director. Seen on his Mint medal designed by George T. Morgan.

On July 18, Woolley wrote to a numismatic enquirer that the new quarters would begin to be struck about September 1. By the time of that letter, he had resigned as Mint Director to become head of publicity for President Wilson's reelection campaign; Fred H. Chaffin became acting director. On August 18, Wilson nominated Woolley's successor, Friedrich Johannes Hugo von Engelken, who was promptly confirmed by the Senate. Von Engelken was supposed to be sworn in on the 21st; his swearing in was delayed until September 1 by President Wilson's failure to sign his commission. One of von Engelken's first acts as Mint Director was to inform MacNeil of McAdoo's acceptance of the design changes, telling him he could place his monogram (a small "M") on the coin; it appears on the wall, to the right of the two low steps which Liberty descends. The bronze casts were made by the Medallic Art Company; on September 6, MacNeil wrote to von Engelken that they would shortly be shipped to the Philadelphia Mint.

By this time, the Mint had experienced considerable difficulties in initiating production of both the dime and half dollar. In the hope of heading off similar problems with the quarter, Mint officials decided to reexamine MacNeil's designs, and subsequently, to adjust them. A number of pattern coins were struck, and von Engelken decided to abandon the dolphins version. By mid-October, patterns with a modified version of MacNeil's original obverse were being struck. On the reverse, the eagle was lowered in position, and a pair of olive branches framing the eagle was replaced by stars. According to Burdette, by making major changes in the design without consulting the designer, Mint officials had "duplicated design versions already rejected by MacNeil, wasted government time, alienated one of the country's best sculptors, and flagrantly bastardized artistic creativity."

MacNeil, who had no idea the Mint was changing his designs, requested permission to visit the Mint on October 24 to discuss the conversion of his approved models into actual coins. Chaffin (again briefly acting director in von Engelken's absence) declined to pay for his journey, and MacNeil did not come. According to Burdette, "the action saved the government less than $20 in October, but may have cost many times that amount before the revised quarter design was accepted the following year." Von Engelken viewed sample coins about that time. He objected to two leaves of the olive branch on the obverse that lay within the angle of the "L" in "Liberty" and asked that they be removed; this was done. The Mint Director then met with Secretary McAdoo to view coins struck from the modified dies. McAdoo felt that the figure of Liberty was indistinct, but von Engelken persuaded him that could not be changed without considerable delay. They did decide that the Mint could make the shield clearer, and approved the design with that instruction. Feeling it was impossible to make the change in time to strike coins in 1916, von Engelken instructed Joyce that beginning in 1917, the figure of Liberty should be sharpened. By the time dies were finally made, the year 1916 was almost over, and only 52,000 quarters were struck. This was done as proof that the Barber design had been replaced in the 25th year, as Mint officials believed was required.

== Modification ==
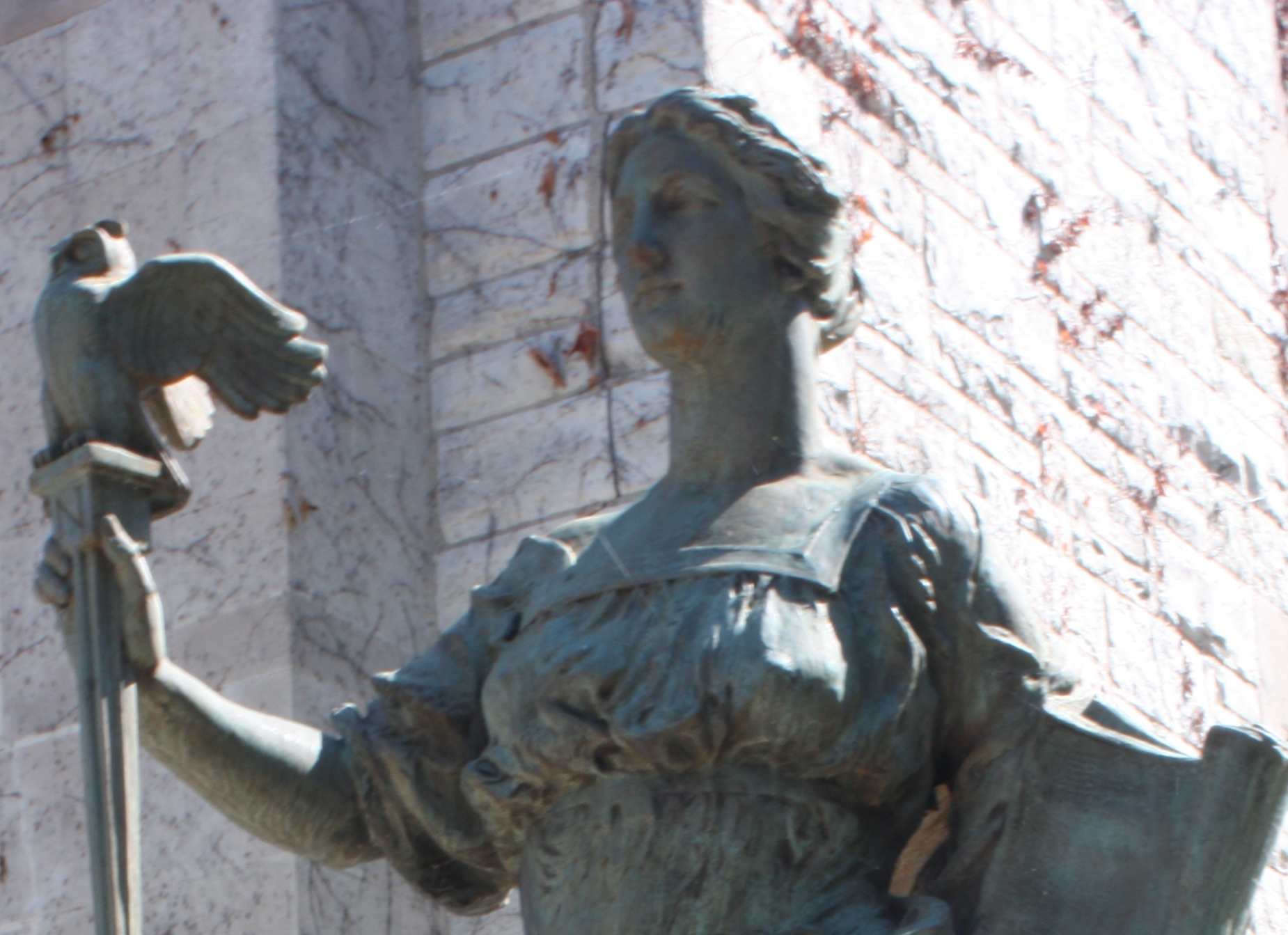
MacNeil's statue Intellectual Development (detail shown) bears similar garb to Liberty on the Standing Liberty quarter.

Throughout late 1916, the Mint was intensely busy first sharpening the design to be used in 1917, and then in large-scale preparation of dies to begin striking the new quarters on a massive scale once the new year began. Small change was in great demand: Mint officials had hoped not to strike any Barber pieces in 1916, but eventually had to do so in large quantities to satisfy the need. Once new quarters were struck, fearing the new pieces would be hoarded (especially the low-mintage 1916 coin), von Engelken instructed that no pieces be released without his order. Small quantities of the new quarters were available, however, to officials and to prominent numismatists. MacNeil, who had not heard from the Mint about his coins since the formal acceptance of his dolphin design, read in the newspaper in early January that the Mint was starting to strike his quarters. He wrote to von Engelken on January 6, enclosing a $5 money order, and was sent 20 of the new pieces. After seeing what the Mint had done to his designs, MacNeil wrote again to von Engelken, criticizing the artistic nature of the changes in such strong terms that the Mint Director continued his embargo on the coins' release. The sculptor pointed out, for example, that the lower position of the eagle made it appear about to land—with its talons in a position only assumed at great heights. Von Engelken feared that should the sculptor's objections become public and not be addressed, the Mint would be exposed to ridicule. MacNeil visited the Philadelphia Mint and its engraving department on January 10. No records of his visit are extant, but von Engelken telephoned from Washington to Philadelphia the same day to ensure that the new quarters did not leave the Mint.

After receiving MacNeil's letter, von Engelken conferred with sculptor and Commission of Fine Arts member Herbert Adams, and with Commission Chairman Charles Moore. Von Engelken agreed that the design of the quarter could be modified to meet MacNeil's wishes. Although no correspondence is known to exist, it appears that the Mint Director and sculptor spoke by telephone over the next several days, as on January 17, von Engelken sent Secretary McAdoo a letter asking for discretion to allow MacNeil to modify the design. McAdoo summoned MacNeil to Washington for a meeting, and then ordered von Engelken to provide MacNeil with all the facilities and help he would need at the Philadelphia Mint—von Engelken had intended that the redesign take place at the sculptor's expense. On January 17, the Mint released the first Standing Liberty quarters, dated both 1916 and 1917, into circulation. On January 30, 1917, von Engelken instructed Joyce to give MacNeil full facilities, and told the Mint Superintendent, "see that Mr. Barber keeps his objections to himself while Mr. MacNeil is there". George T. Morgan, who had worked under Barber for the Engraver's entire 37-year tenure, was assigned to assist MacNeil.

MacNeil hoped to take what he considered to be the best elements of the two versions of the obverse which had been accepted by the Mint the previous year. The figure of Liberty would be taken from the second version; all other elements would come from the first. No change was to be made to Liberty's bare right breast, but the dolphins would not regain their place. However, Morgan proved unable, given engraving technology at the time, to combine the two obverses, meaning the coin would have to be entirely redone by MacNeil. His new version, completed in mid-February, for the first time covered Liberty's breast, giving her a chain mail shirt. Burdette suggests that this change was not unusual for MacNeil, who was increasingly cladding female figures in garments which covered their breasts, as with his statue Intellectual Development, sculpted around that time, and also reflected the deterioration of the international situation in February 1917, as the United States moved towards war with Germany. The reverse saw modifications to the eagle, which was raised in its position on the coin; three of the thirteen stars on the reverse were placed between the bird and the words "Quarter Dollar". Also a dot between the words "QUARTER DOLLAR" and between the words "UNITED STATES" was removed.

The redesign of the obverse has led to an enduring myth that the breast was covered up out of prudishness, or in response to public outcry. Breen stated that "through their Society for the Suppression of Vice, the guardians of prudery at once began exerting political pressure on the Treasury Department to revoke authorization for these 'immoral' coins". Ron Guth and Jeff Garrett, in their book on US coins by type, aver that the covering up of Liberty was "a change never authorized by MacNeil". Numismatic historian David Lange concedes that there is no evidence of outcry from the public, but suggests that the decision to change the coin was "more likely prompted by objections from the Treasury Department". Numismatist Ray Young, in his 1979 article in Coins magazine about the quarter, suggested that the redesign "came from the symbolism. If Liberty was going to stand up to her foes, she should do so fully-protected—not 'naked to her enemies.' Thus the war probably had much more to do with the change than any alleged 'public indignation.' "

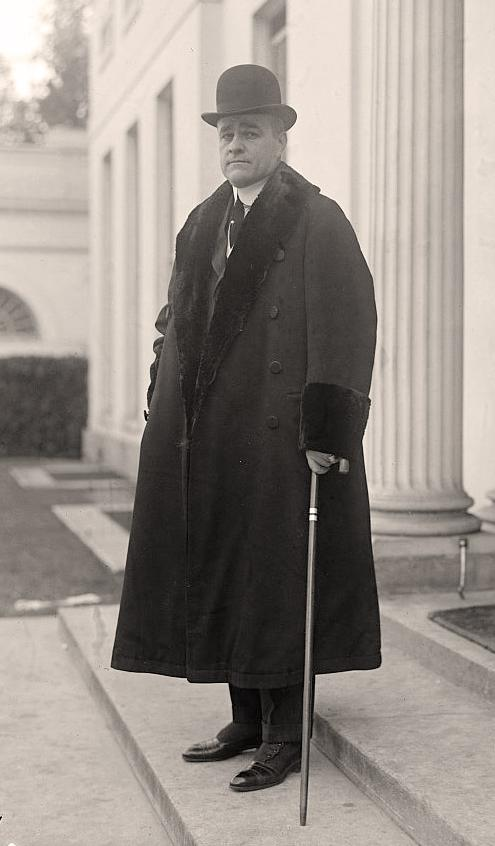
Mint Director Raymond T. Baker

Von Engelken had wanted to be president of the Federal Land Bank for the Third District. He was appointed to that post on February 8, 1917, but remained as Mint Director until February 20; his successor, Raymond T. Baker, was nominated on February 10. Work on the new quarter was briefly interrupted by the death of Chief Engraver Barber at the age of 77 on February 18. One of von Engelken's final acts in office was to recommend the appointment of Barber's successor, Morgan, who was subsequently nominated by Wilson and confirmed by the Senate.

Upon taking office in February 1917, Baker familiarized himself with the redesign of the quarter. After conferring with other Treasury officials, he decided that the redesign would be in violation of the 1890 act, and would require legislation from Congress. McAdoo concurred, and wrote to Representative William A. Ashbrook (Democrat-Ohio) on April 16, 1917. Ashbrook was not only chairman of the House Committee on Coinage, Weights and Measures, he was a noted coin collector. McAdoo explained the need for the redesign, "since the original dies were made the artist has found that they are not true to the original design and that a great improvement can be made in the artistic value and appearance of the coin by making the slight changes the act contemplates".

Legislation to authorize a change was debated in the Senate on April 30, 1917; Oklahoma Senator Robert L. Owen represented that the change was needed because the coins would not stack. Wyoming Senator Francis E. Warren complained that the Mint had needed legislation to adjust coin designs in the past and it would be simpler if officials would ensure that coins would stack before releasing them into circulation. Nevertheless, the bill passed. The matter was brought up in the House of Representatives on June 25, led by Congressman Ashbrook, who told his colleagues both that the issued design was not true to the artist's concept, and that the coins would not stack well. Debate in the House focused on the fact that the legislation gave the Mint until July 1918 to effect the change as Ashbrook had stated that the Mint, having prepared the new design, was only waiting for the bill to pass to commence production. One congressman offered an amendment to change the date to 1917, and others spoke in favor of that, but they desisted when they realized that making a change would require the Senate to act again. The bill passed the House, and became law on July 9, 1917. In August, MacNeil wrote to Joyce requesting samples of the revised coin and expressing his pleasure it was being struck according to his design.

== Production and collecting ==
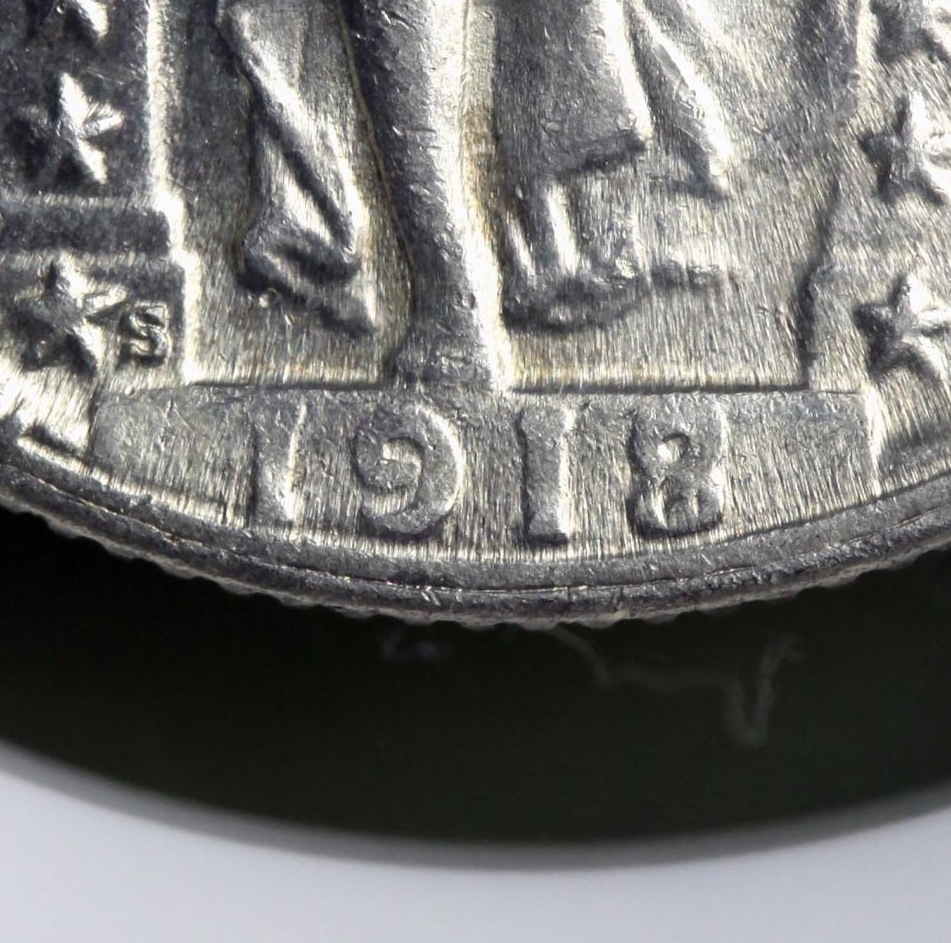
Detail of 1918/7-S quarter, with the mint mark located next to the lowermost star on the left

The Standing Liberty quarter was struck at the Philadelphia Mint from 1916 to 1930 with the exception only of 1922, when no quarters were struck at any mint. It was produced less regularly at Denver and San Francisco beginning in 1917. The mint mark "D" for Denver or "S" for San Francisco may be found at the base of the wall, just to the left of Liberty's visible foot. The key date in the series is the 1916, with a mintage of 52,000. It catalogs for $3,250 even in worn Good-4 condition. The 1921 issue from Philadelphia and the 1923 from San Francisco (1923-S) are also expensive, with costs in the hundreds of dollars even for coins graded “Good-4” and “Very Good-8”. The Standing Liberty quarter is the only 20th-century regular issue US coin for which no proof coins were struck. However, a handful of specimen examples of the 1917 Type 1 issue (that is, the coins struck early in 1917 before MacNeil revised the design) exist. Breen reported six known, all with exceptionally sharp central details.

It had long been a practice at the Mint to recut unused dies at the end of the year to show the following year's date. During the 18th and 19th centuries, die cutting was difficult and expensive. As making dies became cheaper and easier, the practice mostly died out around the turn of the 20th century. However, a 1917-S Type 2 die, unused by the San Francisco Mint, was recut and used to strike several thousand 1918-S quarters. Few are known, and the coins command prices in the low thousands even in well-circulated conditions.

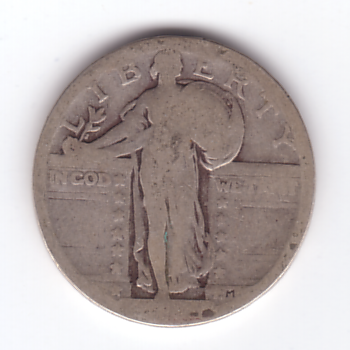
This Standing Liberty quarter, like many others minted before 1925, has had its date mostly worn off through extensive circulation.

By late 1924, Mint officials realized there was a problem with the quarter in circulation. Quarters were returning to the Mint with the date completely worn off. Unwilling to seek another act of Congress, Mint officials made the step on which the date appears recessed into the design, rather than raised from it. This change solved the problem; quarters from 1925 and after are more common and cheaper in lower grades as they have survived with their dates intact. This action was among the last acts of the Engraver's Department under Morgan, who died on January 4, 1925, and was succeeded by John R. Sinnock. The modification meant that the 1927-S, with a mintage of 396,000 is much cheaper in circulated grades than the 1923-S, with a mintage of 1,360,000, though the 1927-S is more expensive in uncirculated grades.

No quarters were struck in 1931; there was no call for them in commerce due to the Depression. Since 1930, there had been an effort among those organizing the commemoration of the bicentennial of George Washington's 1732 birth to seek a Washington half dollar, to be struck as the regular issue for 1932. When a bill for a Washington commemorative was introduced to Congress in February 1931, it changed the quarter rather than the half dollar. While the reasons for the change were not recorded, the House Coinage Committee issued a memorandum stating that "the new design would replace the present type of quarter dollar", was on "a popular denomination" and "would replace an unsatisfactory design now being issued". Congress passed the act on March 4, 1931, and the new Washington quarter began to be struck in 1932, ending the Standing Liberty series. Nevertheless, many Standing Liberty quarters remained in circulation until silver coins began to be hoarded by the public in 1964, prompting the change to base-metal pieces.

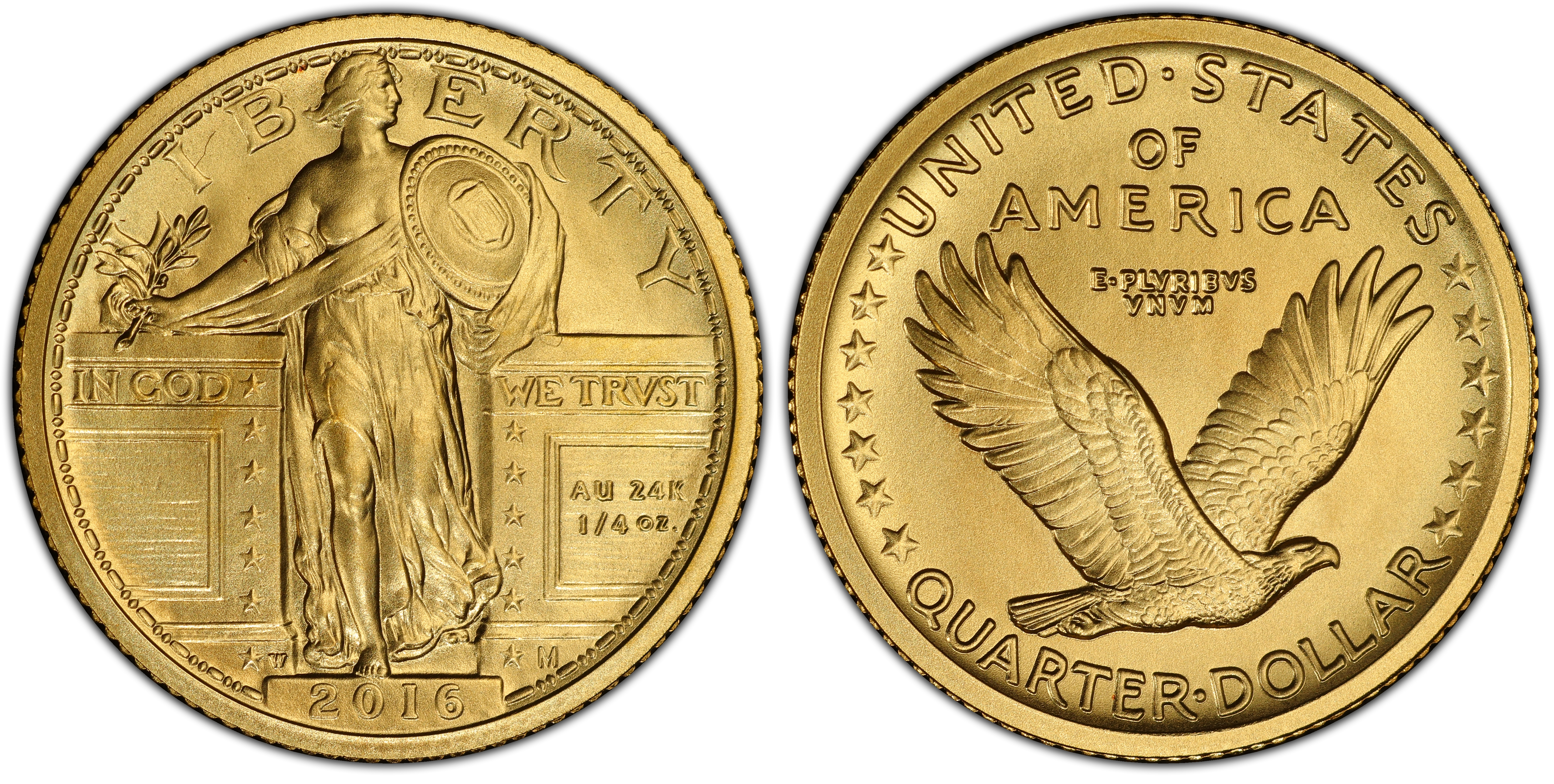
2016-W gold Standing Liberty quarter

The United States Mint in 2015 announced plans to restrike for collectors, in gold, the three silver coins first issued in 1916. The quarter would have its weight and fineness inscribed on the obverse, and thus would technically be a bullion coin. The quarter was to be the original 1916, with the bared breast. No more than 100,000 were minted at the West Point Mint (mint mark "W" is in the same location as all other coins of this type). The gold Standing Liberty quarter is being issued again, with a 1916 date and special privy mark, as part of the Mint's 2026 "Best of the Mint" series for the United States Semiquincentennial, along with a silver medal evoking the quarter's imagery.

== See also ==
- Standing Liberty quarter mintage figures – dates and mintage figures for the Standing Liberty quarter

== Bibliography ==
- Bowers, Q. David (2006). A Guide Book of Washington and State Quarters. Atlanta, GA: Whitman Publishing. ISBN 978-0-7948-2059-6.
- Breen, Walter (1988). Walter Breen's Complete Encyclopedia of U.S. and Colonial Coins. New York: Doubleday. ISBN 978-0-385-14207-6.
- Burdette, Roger W. (2005). Renaissance of American Coinage, 1916–1921. Great Falls, VA: Seneca Mill Press. ISBN 978-0-9768986-0-3.
- Cline, J.H. (2007). Standing Liberty Quarters (4th ed.). Irvine, CA: Zyrus Press Inc. ISBN 978-1-933990-00-2.
- Guth, Ron; Garrett, Jeff (2005). United States Coinage: A Study by Type. Atlanta, GA: Whitman Publishing. ISBN 978-0-7948-1782-4.
- Lange, David W. (1993). A Complete Guide Book to Mercury Dimes. Virginia Beach, VA: DLRC Press. ISBN 978-1-880731-17-8.
- Lange, David W. (2006). History of the United States Mint and its Coinage. Atlanta, GA: Whitman Publishing. ISBN 978-0-7948-1972-9.
- Taxay, Don (1983) [1966]. The U.S. Mint and Coinage (reprint ed.). New York: Sanford J. Durst Numismatic Publications. ISBN 978-0-915262-68-7.
- Vermeule, Cornelius (1971). Numismatic Art in America. Cambridge, MA: The Belknap Press of Harvard University Press. ISBN 978-0-674-62840-3.
- Yeoman, R.S. (2014). Bressett, Kenneth (ed.). A Guide Book of United States Coins 2015 (68th ed.). Atlanta, Georgia: Whitman Publishing. ISBN 978-079484215-4. OCLC 875521690. OL 28306197M.

Other sources

- "The Administration and its Attitude to Art: The Coinage". The Art World. 1 (1). New York: The Kalon Publishing Company, Inc.: 19–20, 74 October 1916. JSTOR 25587646.
- Benford, Timothy B. Jr. (December 2003). "MacNeil's Liberty: Art or Obscenity?". The Numismatist. Colorado Springs, CO: 32–35.
- Carter, Frank E. (January 2, 1915). "Don't Want Coin Designs Changed". Michigan Manufacturing and Financial Journal. Detroit: Manufacturers Publishing Company: 16.
- Dolnick, Michael M. (September 1954). "Design Changes on the Liberty Standing Quarter". The Numismatist. Colorado Springs, CO: American Numismatic Association: 980–982.
- LaMarre, Tom (August 2003). "Standing for Liberty". Coins. Iola, WI: Krause Publications: 64.
- Lange, David. "Mercury Dimes. Chapter 1: History of the Mercury Dimes". Virginia Beach, VA: DLRC Press. Archived from the original on August 12, 2012.
- "George T. Morgan". The New York Times. January 6, 1925. (subscription required)
- Richardson, William Allen, ed. (1891). Supplement to the Revised Statutes of the United States. Vol. 1. Washington, D.C.: US Government Printing Office.
- Young, Ray (June 1979). "MacNeil's "Out-standing" Quarter". Coins. Iola, WI: Krause Publications: 74–76, 78, 80.

Preceded by Barber quarter	Standing Liberty quarter 1916–1930	Succeeded by Washington quarter
