= Mercury dime =

US ten-cent coin (minted 1916–1945)

Mercury (Winged Liberty) dime
- United States
- Value: 10 cents (0.10 U.S. dollar)
- Mass: 2.500 g
- Diameter: 17.91 mm (0.705 in)
- Edge: 118 reeds
- Composition: 0.900 silver, 0.100 copper
- Gold: 2016 & 2026 gold commemorative versions: 0.9999 fine, diameter 16.5 mm, mass 0.10 troy oz
- Silver: 0.07234 troy oz
- Years of minting: 1916–1945
- Mint marks: D, S, (2016 only) W. Located on reverse between letter "E" in "ONE" and the base of the olive branch. Philadelphia Mint specimens lack mint mark.

Obverse
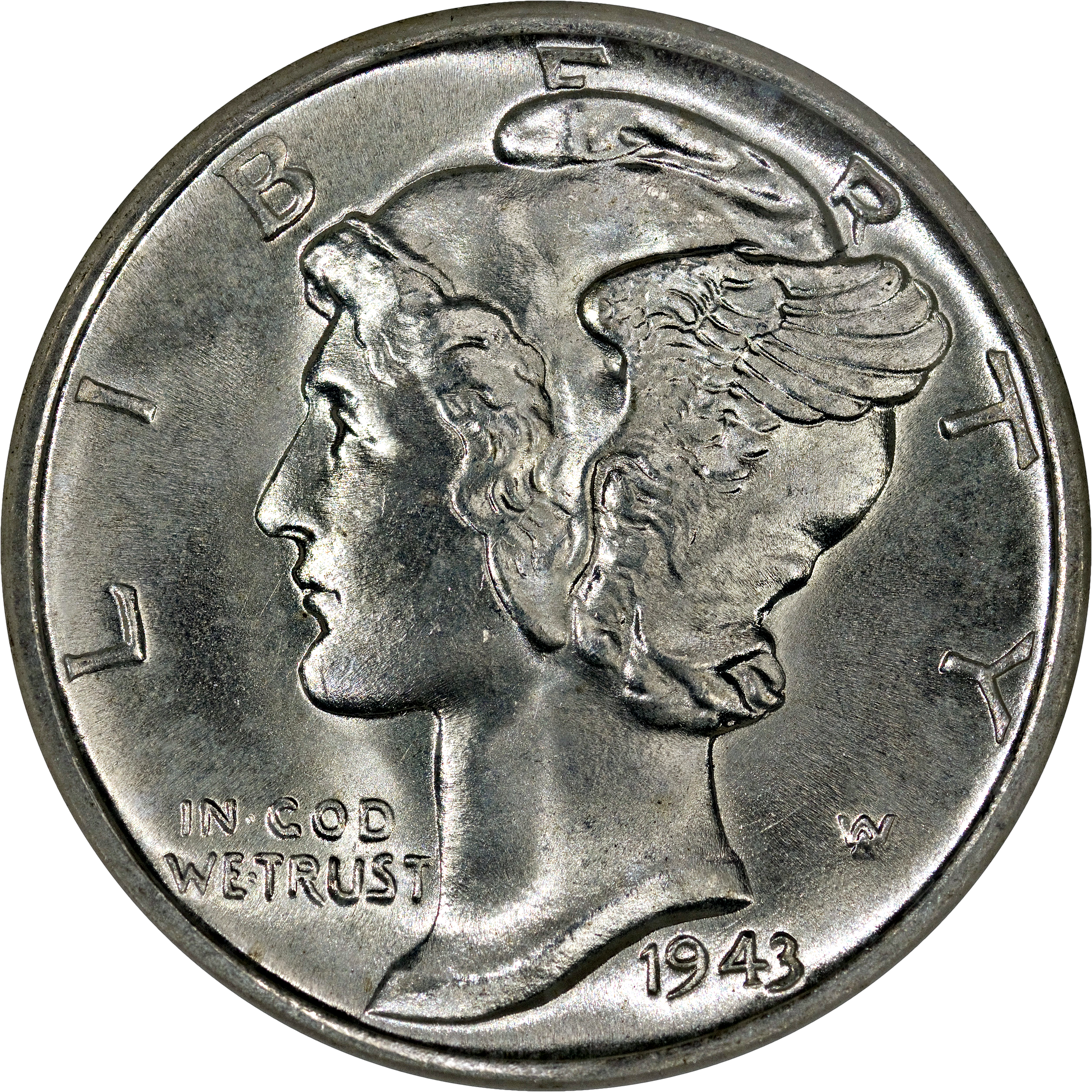
- Design: A young Liberty, with winged cap
- Designer: Adolph Weinman
- Design date: 1916

Reverse
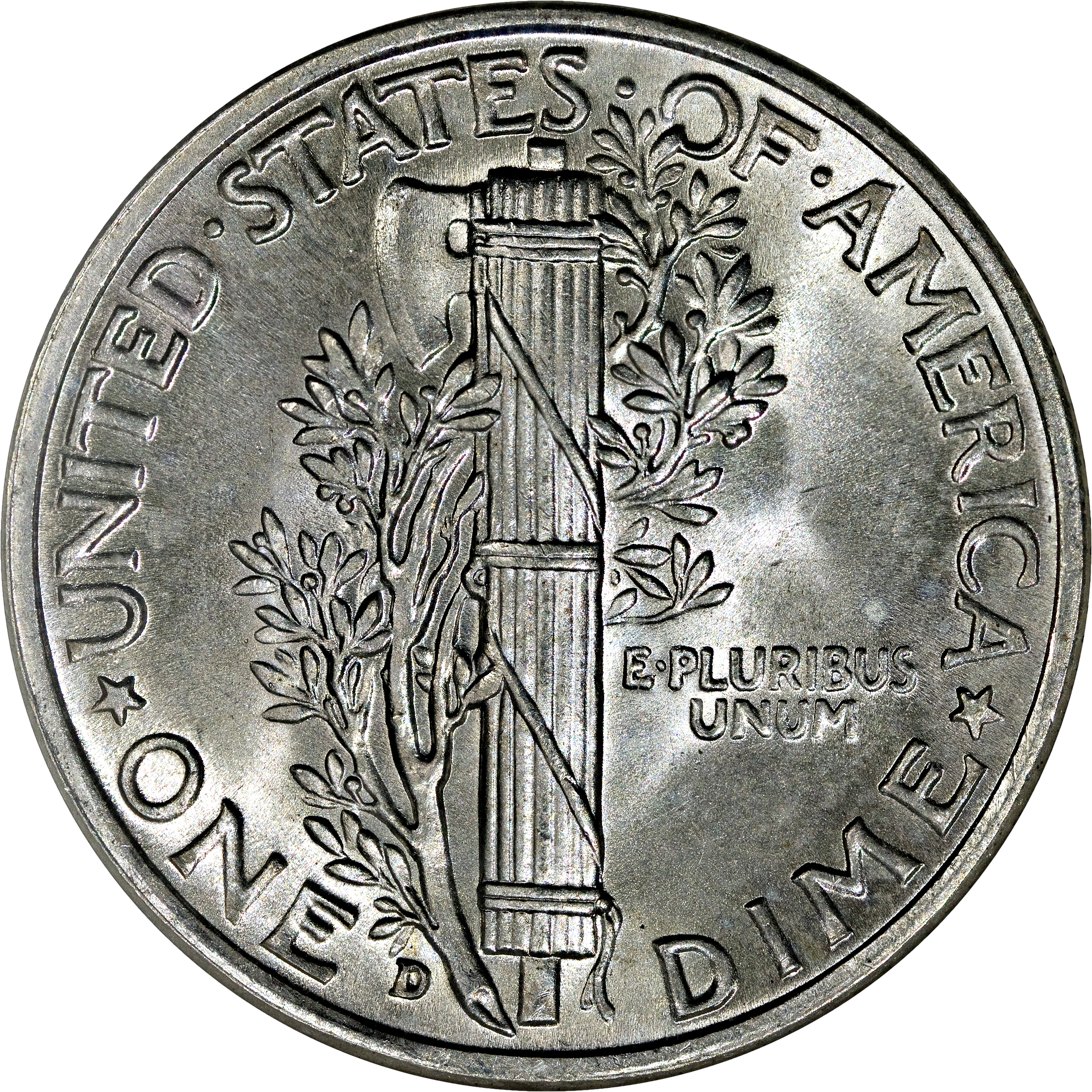
- Design: Olive branch, fasces
- Designer: Adolph Weinman
- Design date: 1916

The Mercury dime is a ten-cent coin struck by the United States Mint from late 1916 to 1945. Designed by Adolph Weinman and also referred to as the Winged Liberty Head dime, it gained its common name because the obverse depiction of a young Liberty, identifiable by her winged Phrygian cap, was confused with the Roman god Mercury. Weinman is believed to have used Elsie Stevens, the wife of lawyer and poet Wallace Stevens, as a model. The coin's reverse depicts a fasces, symbolizing unity and strength, and an olive branch, signifying peace.

By 1916, the dime, quarter, and half dollar designed by Mint Chief Engraver Charles E. Barber had been struck for 25 years, and could be replaced by the Treasury, of which the Mint is a part, without Congressional authorization. Mint officials were under the misapprehension that the designs had to be changed, and held a competition among three sculptors, in which Barber, who had been in his position for 36 years, also took part. Weinman's designs for the dime and half dollar were selected.

Although the new coin's design was admired for its beauty, the Mint made modifications to it upon learning that vending machine manufacturers were having difficulties making the new dime work in their devices. The coin continued to be minted until 1945, when the Treasury ordered that a new design, featuring recently deceased president Franklin Roosevelt, take its place. The Mercury dime was minted in gold for its centenary in 2016 and again with a 1916 date for the 2026 observance of the 250th anniversary of American independence.

== Inception ==
On September 26, 1890, the United States Congress passed an act providing:

The Director of the Mint shall have power, with the approval of the Secretary of the Treasury, to cause new designs ... to be prepared and adopted ... But no change in the design or die of any coin shall be made oftener than once in twenty-five years from and including the year of the first adoption of the design ... But the Director of the Mint shall nevertheless have power, with the approval of the Secretary of the Treasury, to engage temporarily the services of one or more artists, distinguished in their respective departments of art, who shall be paid for such service from the contingent appropriation for the mint at Philadelphia.

The Barber coinage had been introduced in 1892; similar dimes, quarter dollars, and half dollars, all designed by Mint Chief Engraver Charles E. Barber. The introduction had followed a design competition to replace the Seated Liberty coinage, which had been struck since the 1830s. The Mint had offered only a small prize to the winner, and all invited artists refused to submit entries. The competition was open to the public, and the judging committee found no entry suitable. Mint Director Edward Leech responded to the failed competition by directing Barber to prepare new designs for the dime, quarter, and half dollar. The Barber coinage, after its release, attracted considerable public dissatisfaction.

Beginning in 1905, successive presidential administrations had attempted to bring modern, beautiful designs to United States coins. Following the redesign of the double eagle, eagle, half eagle and quarter eagle in 1907 and 1908, as well as the penny and nickel redesigns of 1909 and 1913 respectively, advocates of replacing the Barber coins began to push for the change when the coins' minimum term expired in 1916. As early as 1914, Victor David Brenner, designer of the Lincoln cent, submitted unsolicited designs for the silver coins. He was told in response that Secretary of the Treasury William G. McAdoo was completely occupied with other matters.

On January 2, 1915, an interview with Philadelphia Mint Superintendent Adam M. Joyce appeared in the Michigan Manufacturer and Financial Record:

So far as I know ... there is no thought of issuing new coins of the 50-cent, 25-cent, and 10-cent values. If, however, a change is made we all hope that more serviceable and satisfactory coins are produced than the recent Saint-Gaudens double eagle and eagle and the Pratt half and quarter eagle. The buffalo nickel and the Lincoln penny are also faulty from a practical standpoint. All resulted from the desire by the government to mint coins to the satisfaction of artists and not practical coiners.

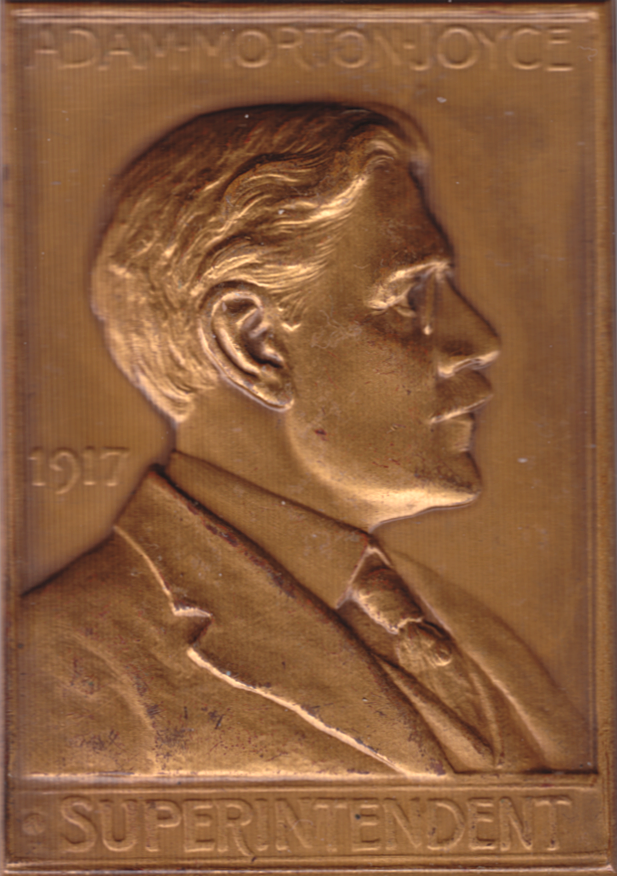
Philadelphia Mint Superintendent Adam M. Joyce decried the Lincoln cent and other new coinage, believing that they struck badly. Plaquette by George T. Morgan.

In January 1915, Assistant Secretary of the Treasury William P. Malburn sent McAdoo a memorandum about the silver subsidiary coinage, noting that "the present silver half dollar, quarter, and dime were changed in 1892, and a new design may, therefore, be adopted in 1916. This can be done any time in the year." In reply, McAdoo wrote "[l]et the mint submit designs before we try anyone else." on the memorandum.

In April 1915, Robert W. Woolley took office as Mint Director. On April 14, he asked Superintendent Joyce to request Chief Engraver Barber, then in his 36th year in office, to prepare new designs. The same day, Malburn requested the opinion of the Treasury Department's Solicitor concerning the Mint view that it could strike new designs for the three denominations in 1916. On April 17, the Solicitor's Office responded that the Mint could change the designs. At the time, the Mint was intensely busy producing the Panama-Pacific commemorative coin issue, and immediate action was not taken. In October, Barber was summoned to Washington to discuss coin designs with Woolley, though it is uncertain whether or not he had already prepared sketches for the new coinage.

On December 3, Woolley met with the Commission of Fine Arts. Woolley asked the Commission to view sketches produced by the Mint's engraving department. Barber was present to explain the coinage process to the Commission members. Woolley suggested to the members that if they did not like the Mint's work, they should select sculptors to submit designs for the new pieces. It was Woolley's intent to have distinct designs for the dime, quarter and half dollar—previously, the three pieces had been near-identical. The director informed the Commission that as the existing coinage had been in use for 25 years, it would have to be changed—something which numismatic historian David Lange calls a "misinterpretation of the coinage laws".

The Commission disliked the sketches from the Mint (submitted by Barber) and selected sculptors Adolph Weinman, Hermon MacNeil and Albin Polasek to submit proposals for the new coins. The sculptors could submit multiple sketches. Although the Mint could decide to use a design on a denomination not intended by its sculptor, the designs were not fully interchangeable—by statute, an eagle had to appear on the reverse of the quarter and half dollar, but could not appear on the dime. Woolley hoped that each sculptor would be successful with one piece.

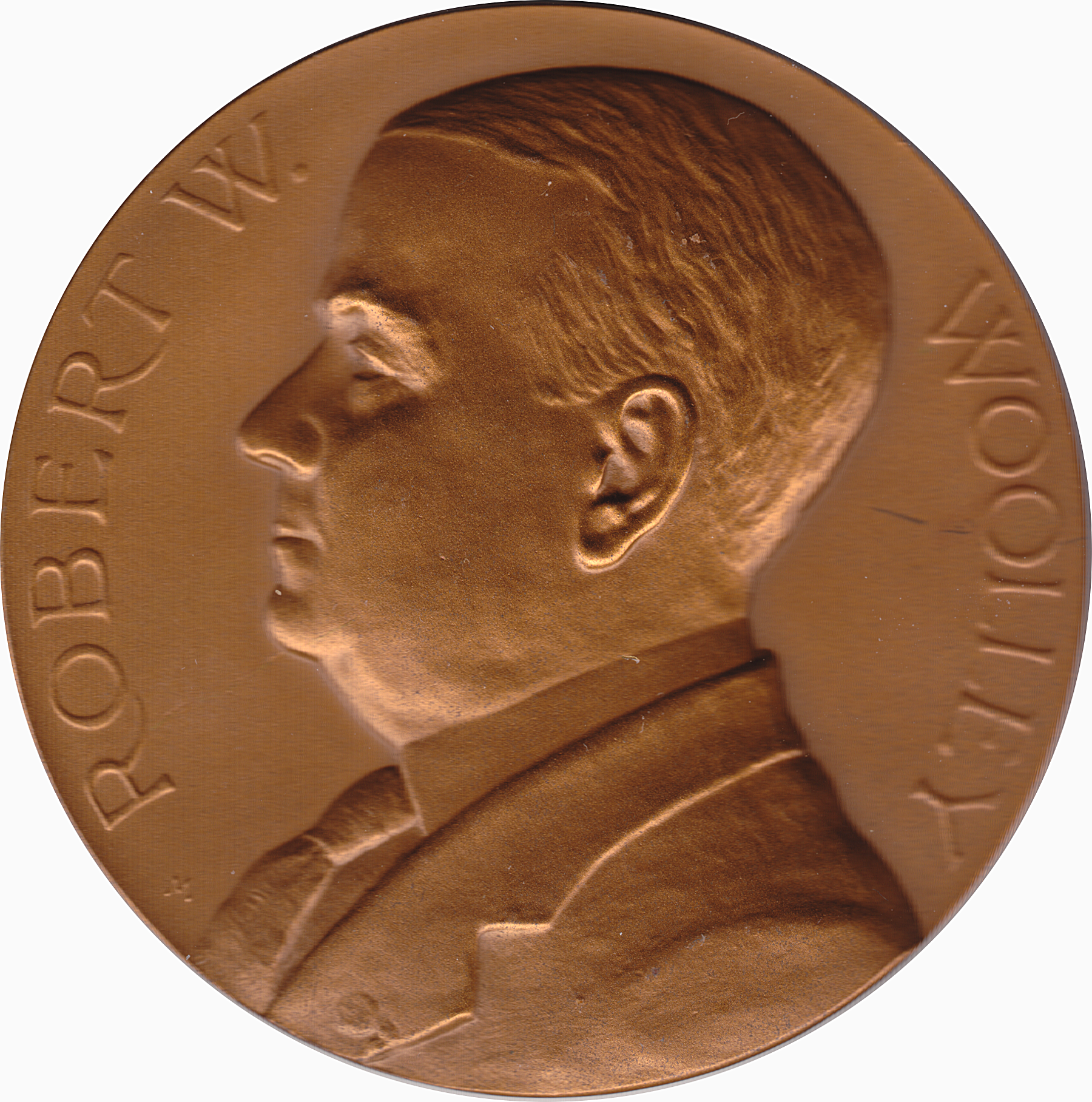
Mint Director Robert W. Woolley (seen on his Mint medal, designed by Assistant Engraver George T. Morgan) advocated for the end of the Barber coinage, though he may not have understood he did not have to replace them.

The three sculptors submitted design sketches in mid-February, and on February 23 met with Woolley in New York so the artists could make presentations of the work to him and answer his questions. After discussions between Woolley and McAdoo, Weinman was notified on February 28 that five of his sketches had been selected—for the dime and half dollar, and the reverse of the quarter. The same day, Woolley wrote to MacNeil to tell him he would sculpt the quarter's obverse, and to Polasek to inform him of his lack of success. Members of the Commission persuaded Woolley that so much should not be entrusted to a single artist, and MacNeil was allowed to design both sides of the quarter, subject to his making modifications to his submission.

On March 3, the new coins were publicly announced, with the Treasury noting, "[d]esigns of these coins must be changed by law every 25 years and the present 25 year period ends with 1916." The press release indicated that the Treasury hoped production of the new coins would begin in about two months, once the designs were finalized. The same day, Woolley wrote to Mint Engraver Barber, telling him that his sketches were rejected, and that models from Weinman and MacNeil would arrive at the Philadelphia Mint no later than May 1. According to numismatic historian Walter Breen, Barber became "sullen and totally uncooperative". Lange notes that "numerous delays were encountered as the artists fine-tuned their models while simultaneously avoiding obstacles thrown in their path by Barber. While his observations regarding many aspects of practical coinage were quite accurate, they clearly could have been presented in a more constructive manner." In his book on Mercury dimes, Lange notes that Barber, by then aged 75, had been "compelled over the past ten years to participate in the systematic undoing of a lifetime's achievements"; he had to participate in the process which resulted in coins designed by others replacing ones designed by him.

With the new pieces, all American coins would have had a recent change of design (the Morgan dollar was not then being struck). According to a column in The Art World magazine later in 1916,

Since that day [the 19th century] much artistic progress has taken place in our coinage. Sculptors of reputation have been employed with admirable results ...And now we are to have a new half dollar and a new dime by Weinman and a new quarter by McNeill [sic]. Altogether, in the retrospect, it seems an incredible achievement.

== Design ==
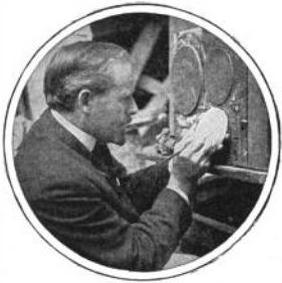
Adolph Weinman is widely believed to have used his neighbor, Elsie Stevens, as the model for the Mercury dime.

Weinman never disclosed the name of the model for the obverse, and no person ever claimed to have been her. The winged Liberty is widely believed, however, to have been based on a 1913 bust Weinman sculpted of Elsie Stevens, wife of Wallace Stevens. A lawyer and insurance executive, Wallace Stevens later became famous as a poet; Wallace and Elsie Stevens rented an apartment from Weinman from 1909 to 1916. In a draft of his unpublished autobiography, Woolley wrote that Weinman refused to name the model, but told him it was the wife of a lawyer who lived above his Manhattan apartment (Woolley, in a later version, omitted the location, saying only that Weinman said it was the wife of a lawyer friend). Woolley recorded that he was told that the model wore the top of an old pair of stockings to simulate the cap. In 1966, Holly Stevens, Wallace and Elsie's daughter, noted in her edition of her father's letters that Elsie had been the model for Weinman's dime and half dollar. Liberty's features also bear a resemblance to the face of Victory in Weinman's 1909 statuary group erected in Baltimore, the Union Soldiers and Sailors' Monument.

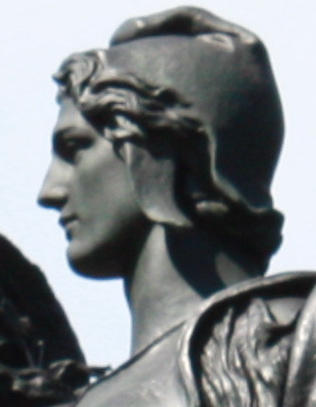
Weinman's 1909 statue of Victory in Baltimore's Union Soldiers and Sailors' Monument has features said to bear a resemblance to those on the Mercury dime.

Weinman's dime depicts Liberty with a wreath of tight curls, and wearing a traditional pileus, or Liberty cap. His depiction of the pileus as a winged cap has provoked comparisons with Roman Republic denarii, which art historian Cornelius Vermeule considered superficial. Weinman wrote that he considered the winged cap to symbolize "liberty of thought". Vermeule suggests that one reason for the use of wings was that Weinman, in common with many in the tradition of Augustus Saint-Gaudens, under whom Weinman had studied, liked the effect of feathers done in relief. The reverse depicts a fasces, the object carried by lictors, who accompanied Roman magistrates; on the coin it represents war and justice. It is contrasted with a large olive branch symbolizing peace. According to Breen, "Weinman's symbolic message in this design ... was clearly an updated 'Don't tread on me'". The fasces is bound both horizontally and diagonally by a leather strap, with the loose ends at the bottom. The lettering is in Roman style, and is made as discreet as possible. Weinman's monogram, AW, appears on the obverse, midway between the date and the letter Y in "LIBERTY". The mintmark is located on the reverse, to the right of the first E in "ONE DIME".

Woolley described the design in his 1916 report to the Secretary of the Treasury:

The design of the dime, owing to the smallness of the coin, has been held quite simple. The obverse shows a head of Liberty with winged cap. The head is simple and firm in form, the profile forceful. The reverse shows a design of the bundle of rods, with battle-ax, known as "Fasces", and symbolical of unity, wherein lies the nation's strength. Surrounding the fasces is a full-foliaged branch of olive, symbolical of peace.

== Preparation ==
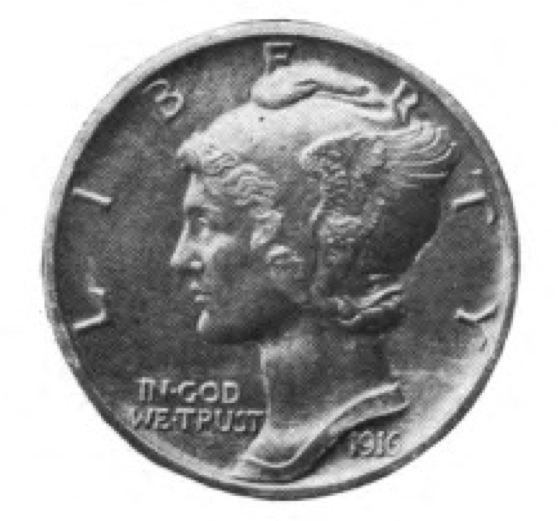
A pattern of the 1916 Mercury dime as illustrated in that year's Mint Director's Report. Note that the head is further to the right of the coin than on the issued piece and the head covers less of the "E". Weinman's monogram is also absent.

After Weinman's success in the competition, he visited the Mint to discuss conversion of his models to finished dies. The first time, he found Barber absent, but had a productive talk with long-time Assistant Engraver George T. Morgan. Other visits followed, and on March 29, Woolley wrote to Superintendent Joyce, "confidentially, the sculptors designing the new coins felt that on their last trip Mr. Morgan was much more cordial and cooperative than Mr. Barber was. I realize I am dealing with artistic temperaments at both ends." A severe case of tonsillitis delayed Weinman's work, and caused him to request an extension of the May 1 deadline. On May 29, Woolley wrote Weinman that the designs, both for the dime and half dollar, were accepted by the Mint.

As no Barber pieces of any of the three denominations had been struck in 1916, the pent-up demand was high. On June 24, Woolley wrote to Joyce:

The dime is all right. Please see that working dies for the three mints are made as rapidly as possible, in order that the coinage of the new dimes may be begun quickly. The demand for these coins is exceedingly great. Everyone to whom the coins have been shown here thinks they are beautiful. I beg to enjoin you not to pay out any of the new dimes until you have received special instructions from this office.

Two days later, work on dies was stopped when it was decided that the lettering was insufficiently distinct. The delay, however, did not prevent the Mint from authorizing payment to Weinman for his designs. On July 15, Woolley resigned as Mint director to work as publicity chairman of the Wilson reelection campaign. As the new director, Friedrich Johannes Hugo von Engelken, did not take office until September 1, 1916, Fred H. Chaffin became acting director. With none of the new designs ready for production, and small change in great demand, the Mint had no alternative other than to strike Barber dimes and quarters by the million.

After the lettering problems were addressed, Acting Director Chaffin halted production of Barber dimes on August 29, and ordered production of the Mercury dime to begin the following day at the Philadelphia Mint. Barber had prepared dies for the Denver and San Francisco mints, but they were still in transit. Small quantities of the new dime had been sent to vending machine and pay phone manufacturers; on September 6, two companies reported problems with the coins. AT&T complained that the new dimes were too thick and would not work in their phones. American Sales Machines (owned by Clarence W. Hobbs, whose complaints had delayed the Buffalo nickel) requested design changes so that its counterfeit detector could work. Von Engelken ordered production of the dimes halted. In reality, the dime was not too thick, but the rim of the coin struck too high, a defect known as a "fin". This had been an ongoing problem as Weinman's design was produced, but was thought to have been corrected. No dimes had yet been struck at the two western mints. Minting of Barber dimes resumed. After an article quoting Joyce appeared in the press, Von Engelken instructed his staff not to speak to reporters.

The problems with the dime were a potential embarrassment with a presidential campaign underway. McAdoo enquired how much time would be required for another design to be struck; he was informed it would take months. Instead, Weinman prepared modified designs, separating the letters of "LIBERTY" slightly from the rim, and lowering the relief. McAdoo approved the revised design on September 28. These changes assuaged the concerns of both firms. Von Engelken authorized Joyce to produce coinage dies on October 6, and the new coins were put into production. The earlier strikes, including those reclaimed from the testing companies, were melted, though one specimen is currently known to exist.

== Release and production; name and design controversies ==
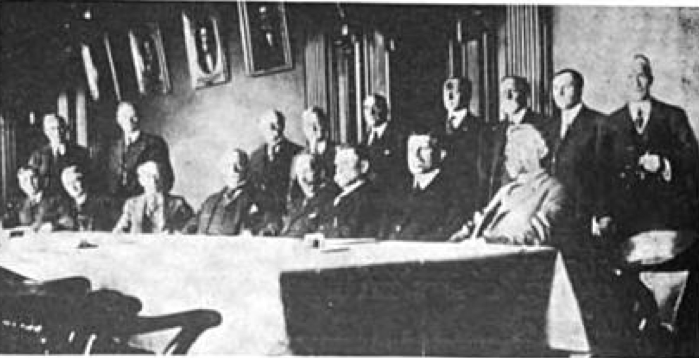
The 1916 United States Assay Commission met on February 9 and February 10, 1916, to test coins from the previous year to ensure they met specifications. Among the members and Mint officials shown were then-Mint Director Robert W. Woolley (standing fourth from left), Engraver of the United States Mint at Philadelphia Charles E. Barber (standing third from left) and Philadelphia Mint Superintendent Adam Joyce (standing at far right).

The Mercury dime was released into circulation on October 30, 1916, the same day that production of the Barber dime ceased. Several newspapers complained that Weinman's monogram was too prominent on the obverse; according to The New York Times, the Treasury was considering removal. On November 4, Weinman enquired of Joyce whether any removal was contemplated; he received in reply compliments on his design and Joyce's statement that the Mint was not responsible for what appeared in print. Weinman wrote again, hoping to make changes to the dime, but was told that only an act of Congress could change the design.

Of the three circulating coins first struck in 1916, the Mercury dime was particularly praised. On the first day of circulation, quantities sold were limited at banks. One Minneapolis newspaper dubbed it the "battle ax" or "golf" dime, reflecting a lack of knowledge concerning the fasces. A letter to the editor in the January 1917 The Numismatist appears to be the first numismatic reference to the coin by the nickname "Mercury". Lange traced the history of this misnomer,

This misattribution appeared almost immediately in the popular press, as writers imagined that the obviously female Liberty was actually a representation of Mercury, messenger to the Roman gods of mythology and quite certainly a male. It is popularly known as the Mercury Dime even today, despite noble but ill-fated attempts by some publications to reverse this error.

Chief Engraver Barber died on February 18, 1917, having served 37 years in office. His successor was the 72-year-old Morgan, who had served under Barber for his entire tenure.

The dime was struck in substantial numbers until 1930, with the notable exception of the 1916-D issue and from 1921 to 1923, when an economic downturn caused the need for coins to diminish. No dimes were struck for 1922, the first time since 1826 that this had occurred. With the onset of the Great Depression, mintages dropped again in 1930 and 1931; coinage of dimes was suspended entirely in 1932 and 1933. The low-mintage dates are not rare today as many were hoarded, and 1930- and 1931-dated dimes proved readily available from the banks once the economy improved. With the economy beginning to pick up again, coinage resumed in 1934, and the dime was struck in large numbers each year through the end of the series.

In the early 1930s, with the rise of fascist movements in Europe, objections began to be raised in the United States to the presence of fasces, the emblem of Mussolini's National Fascist Party, on the dime's reverse. However, defenders of the dime stressed that the fasces were meant as a symbol of unity.

The death of President Franklin Roosevelt in April 1945 brought immediate calls for a coin to be issued with his image. As Roosevelt had been closely associated with the March of Dimes, and as the dime's design could be replaced without the need for congressional action as it had been struck for more than 25 years, the Treasury chose that denomination to honor Roosevelt. Mint Chief Engraver John R. Sinnock, Morgan's successor, executed the design featuring Roosevelt, which replaced the Mercury dime in 1946, making 1945 the last year in which it was produced. According to Mint Director Nellie Tayloe Ross, a total of 2,677,232,488 Mercury dimes were struck.

== Collecting ==
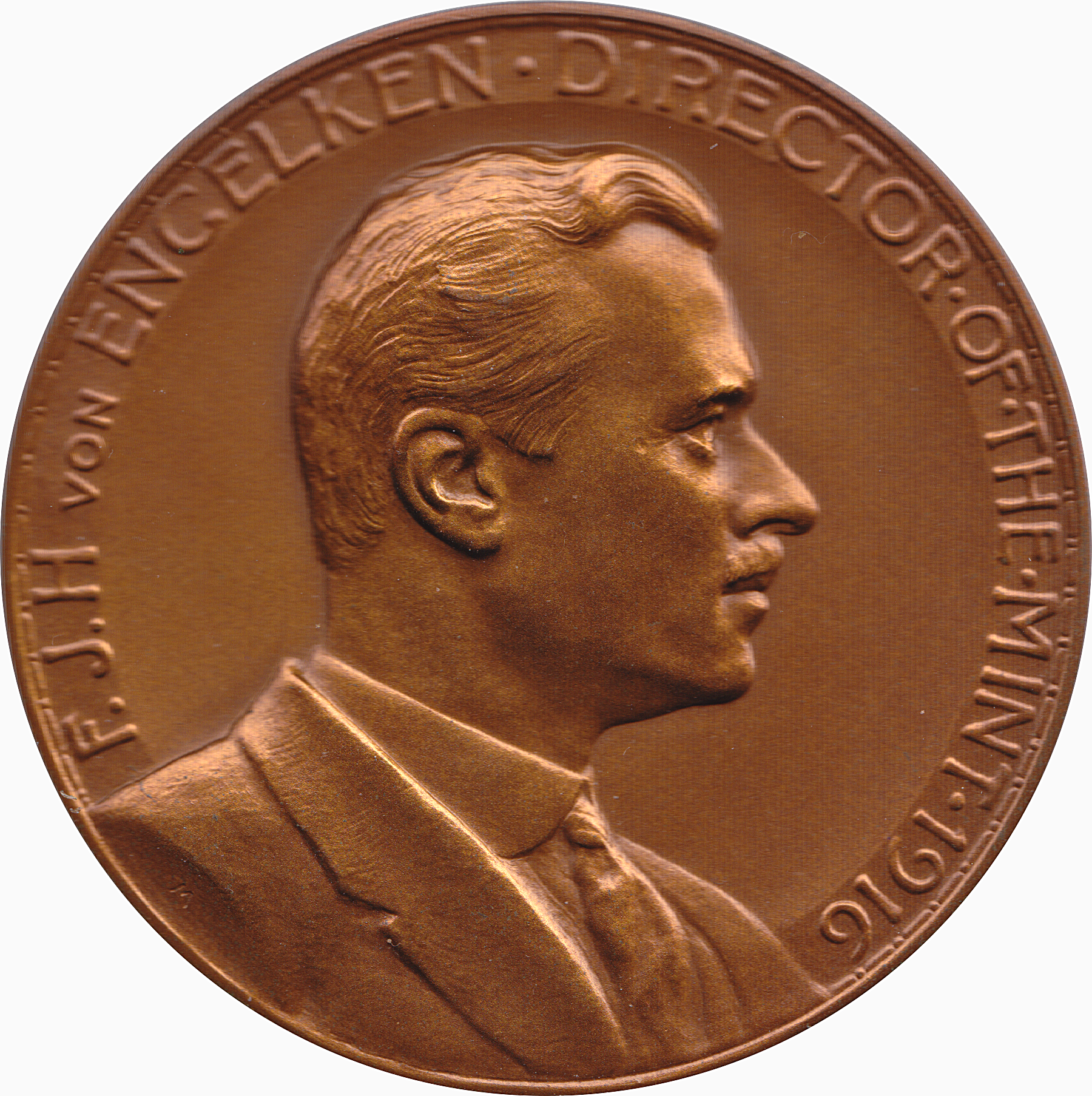
The Mint medal for Director Friedrich Johannes Hugo von Engelken, designed by George T. Morgan, who was then assistant engraver.

The 1916-D Mercury dime, struck at the Denver Mint, is the key date of the series, with a mintage of 264,000 pieces. The low mintage is because in November 1916, von Engelken informed the three mint superintendents of a large order for quarters, and instructed that Denver strike only quarters until it was filled. Striking of dimes at Denver did not resume until well into 1917, making the 1917-D relatively rare as well.

Few varieties are known in the Mercury dime series. The 1942/41 is generally termed an overdate; it is actually a doubled die error—the obverse die from which the coins were struck took one impression from a 1942-dated hub and one from a 1941-dated hub (until the 1990s, dies required two strikes from a hub for the design to be fully impressed). Sinnock stated that the pieces were most likely struck in late 1941, when preparation of the 1942 dies was under way. Also produced at that time, though less apparent to the naked eye, was the 1942/1-D. Another popular variety is the 1945-S "Micro S", with a smaller-than-normal mintmark. This variety was caused by the Mint's wartime use of a puncheon (used to impress mintmarks on dies and hubs) which had been made for use with early 20th century Philippine coinage struck at San Francisco, which had only a small space for the mintmark. Beginning in 1928, coin albums were issued by private publishers, mostly in folder form, which were widely used to collect the pieces. This led to a great increase in interest in collecting current coinage by date and mintmark.

Many Mercury dimes were not fully struck, meaning that design detail was lost even before the coins entered circulation. Exceptionally well-struck dimes display "full bands", that is, the horizontal bands on the fasces show full detail. In circulation, the reverse tended to more readily display wear due to a lower rim in relation to the relief of the design. Most well-circulated dimes show more wear to the reverse.

Although no 1923 or 1930 dimes were struck at Denver, specimens appearing to be 1923-D or 1930-D dimes may be encountered. These counterfeits are struck in good silver, allowing the coiner to profit on the difference between the cost of production and the face value. They did not appear until after World War II, are invariably found in worn condition, and are believed to have been struck in the Soviet Union, a country known to have counterfeited US coins during World War II.

=== Project Mercury ===
Several Mercury dimes were flown into space on July 21, 1961, on the Mercury-Redstone 4 sub-orbital mission, the second crewed flight of Project Mercury and the second human space flight by the United States. The coins sank with the capsule in the Atlantic Ocean, but were later recovered with the capsule from a depth of nearly 16,000 ft (4,900 m) in 1999.

== Gold versions ==
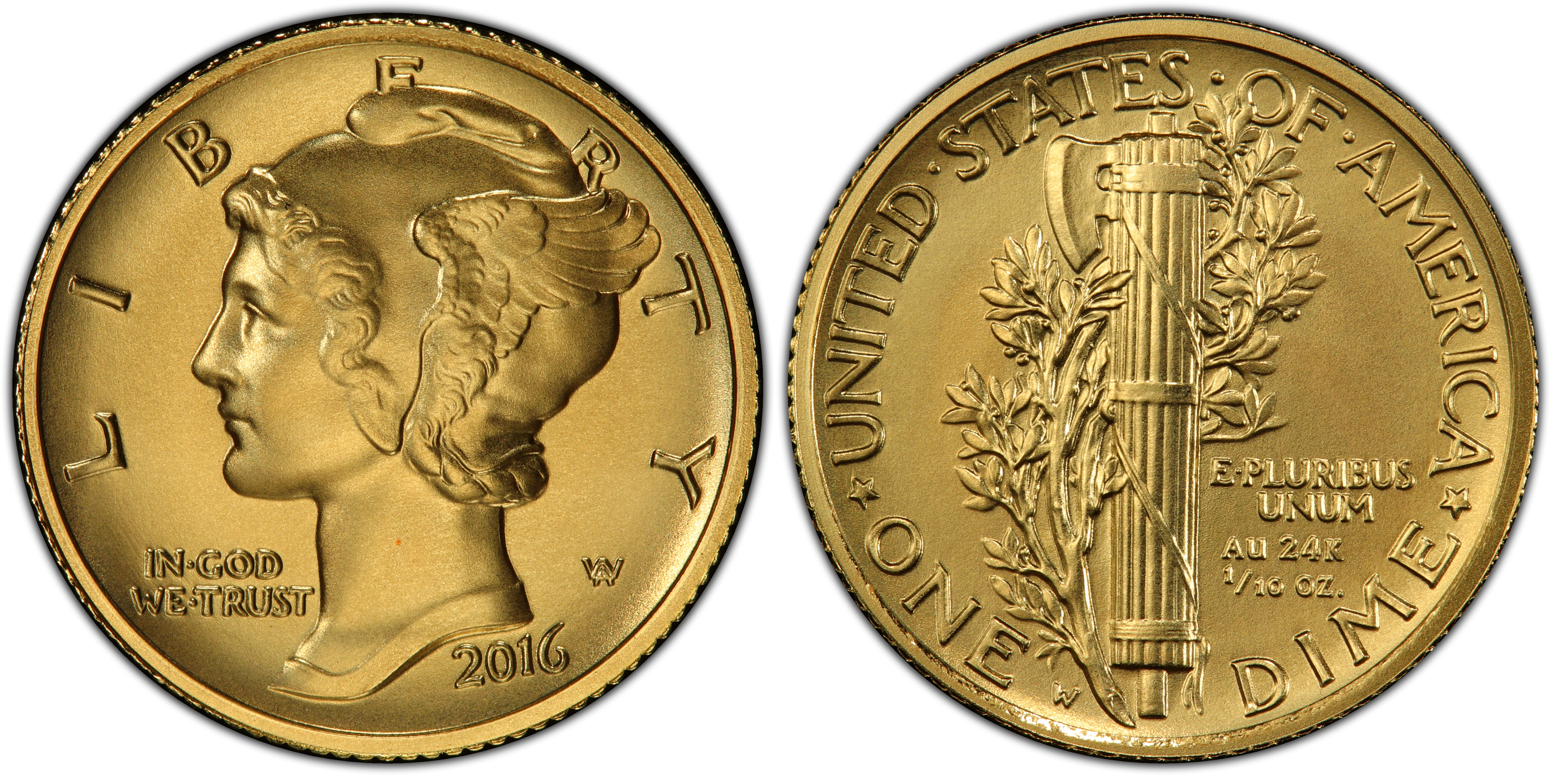
2016-W Gold Mercury dime

The Mint released a centennial version, in gold, of the Mercury dime on April 21, 2016, sold through the Mint's official website. Demand was so high that orders were no longer able to be placed within 45 minutes of the coin becoming available. On April 26, the Mint reported that it had sold 122,510 units, just 2,490 pieces away from the item's maximum allowable mintage. The remainder, which included about as many as 8,000 to 9,000 coins that were unsold or returned to the mint from prior sales, were offered for sale on December 15, 2016, with a limit of one per customer, and sold out within 90 minutes.

In July 2025, the Mint announced it would re-issue the gold version in 2026, with a 1916 date and a Liberty Bell privy mark. The gold coin was accompanied by a silver medal as part of the 2026 "Best of the Mint" commemoration, part of the observance of the 250th anniversary of American independence. Released on June 4, 2026, the mintage limit of 30,000 sold out within five hours.
