= Front-runner =

Leader in an electoral race

In politics, a front-runner (also spelled frontrunner or front runner) is a leader in an electoral race. While the front-runner in athletic events (the namesake of the political concept) is generally clear, a political front-runner, particularly in the presidential primary process, is less so as a potential nominee may lead in the polls, have the most name recognition, the most funds raised, or a combination of these. The front-runner is most often declared by the media who are following the race and is written about in a different style than his or her challengers.

== Etymology ==
The word front-runner originated in the United States. The term emerged from foot racing. It was used by 1914. According to Merriam-Webster the term meant "a contestant who runs best when in the lead" by that time. However the Dictionary of American Slang says it meant "the leader in a contest, election, etc." by that year.

The adjective front-running was used by 1940. It also originated from racing. The meaning of the word was analogous to its nounal counterpart at that time. The term was used as a noun by 1970 in the United States to mean "support given to a person or team only when they are doing well." By the 1980s a new definition for front-running emerged from the commodities market in which the word was also used as a noun. The definition was used to describe "a type of fraud in which a trader withholds a large customer order so that he can personally profit from its effect on the market."

The intransitive verb front-run emerged by 1950. It originated from a back formation of front-runner. By that year it had a meaning that was analogous to its nounal counterpart.

The related word frontrunneritis was used by 1995. It is a combination of frontrunner and –itis, a suffix frequently used informally to describe a tendency or mood that is comparable to a disease. The term was used by that time to describe "the condition of being a leading candidate." In particular it was used to characterize "a tendency to coast or to be under increased scrutiny by the press."

== Performance ==
American author, columnist, journalist and presidential speechwriter William Safire describes the front-runner as being able to leave "the starting gate well" and set the pace for the other contestants. He uses the racing term "shows early foot" to characterize this tendency. Safire says occasionally the front-runner's lead becomes "insurmountable." He cites Barry Goldwater's successful 1964 Republican presidential nomination and Jimmy Carter's success in several convention states and early primaries in his 1976 presidential campaign as examples.

However Safire says the modern usage of the word front-runner has "ominous overtones" of being likely to eventually lose. As an example he references Franklin D. Roosevelt's receiving a letter from Robert W. Woolley about Roosevelt's front-runner status early in his 1932 presidential campaign: "Herein lies the danger ... automatically you become the target of the other candidates, real and potential. There isn't a single favorite son whose delegation won't be held out of the Roosevelt column so long as there is a reasonable chance of getting something for that favorite son, even at your expense." Safire gives another example when he quotes Ted Sorensen's thoughts about John F. Kennedy's front-runner status during his 1960 presidential campaign: "There were disadvantages in being the 'front runner.' The Senator's critics became more open and vocal and his every word was politically interpreted."

The outcome of the second round of primaries is critical to a front-runner's success. Safire argues that the front-runner "must come thundering into the convention increasing his speed and with enough 'kick' left for a final spurt" to be successful. He quotes Thomas E. Dewey writing about his losing the 1940 Republican presidential nomination as an example: "When the balloting starts, every candidate wants to show enough strength to be one of the leaders on the first ballot. He also wants to have enough strength in reserve so he can gain on the psychologically important second ballot. For example, in 1940, I led on the first three ballots out of six—the wrong three. I lost ground on the second ballot. That was the beginning of the end and everybody knew it."

Safire states that front-runners often take advantage of the bandwagon effect by emphasizing their "inevitability factor." He says this is done by suggesting the futility of the front-runner's opponents. However Safire notes that a front-runner's "inevitability" can be vulnerable to their opponents. Safire cites the example of George W. Bush's front-runner status in the 2000 Republican primary being threatened by John McCain's victory in the New Hampshire primary. Another example he notes is Gary Hart's upset win in the New Hampshire primary, which challenged Walter Mondale's front-runner status in the 1984 Democratic primary. Safire quotes Peter Hart, a pollster "who advised" Walter Mondale, commenting on the 1984 race in 2007: "Inevitability is not a message ... there needs to be something to grab on to. Inevitability is not a tune that people can march to." Safire also cites journalist Adam Gourney's thoughts: "[N]othing invites a teardown more than being perceived as the front-runner. Being on top makes you a big target for your opponents and the news media, and sets you up for buyer's remorse, a common phenomenon in the nomination process, even before the sale is done."

Safire says that despite the risks in being the front-runner, candidates prefer it over being a dark horse or a long shot because that position has a higher chance of winning. Front-runners often have a financial advantage over dark horses.

=== Early front-runners ===
External audio
- The Front-Runner Fallacy: Does It Really Matter Who Takes The Early Lead?, Here and Now

David Greenberg, associate professor of History and of Journalism and Media Studies at Rutgers University, states that front-runners decided by early polls often do not win the nomination. Greenberg notes that early polls decided Birch Bayh in the 1976 Democratic primary, Ted Kennedy in the 1980 Democratic primary, Jesse Jackson in the 1988 Democratic primary, Jerry Brown in the 1992 Democratic primary, Howard Dean in the 2004 Democratic primary and Herman Cain in the 2012 Republican primary as front-runners, all of whom lost the nomination.

Greenberg suggests that the futility of most early front-runners reflects early polls' unreliability and in particular, their respondents' indifference to the candidates. He notes that indifference is especially justified for electorates whose state primary runs during the later stages of the race. He cites David Karol, a political scientist, who says that "[t]he media don't always report the numbers that say 'not sure' or 'don't know enough.'"

Greenberg states that the rise of early front-runners is partly due to name recognition. He cites the early lead of Donald Trump in the 2016 Republican primary, Joe Lieberman in the 2004 Democratic primary and George W. Bush in the 2000 Republican primary as examples of this. He further states that early front-runners are established in part due to recent media attention, and notes that Jonathan Bernstein, a political scientist and columnist, shares this view. Greenberg cites the early front-runners Donald Trump in the 2016 Republican primary, Gary Hart in the 1984 Democratic primary and Howard Dean in the 2004 Democratic primary as examples of this.

Greenberg acknowledges that some front-runners decided by early polls win the nomination. He states that this often occurs "in races with few competitors." He notes Al Gore’s early lead in 1999 before winning the 2000 Democratic presidential nomination as an example. Greenberg states that early front-runners can also win if they are an "overwhelming favorite" in the race. He gives Ronald Reagan’s early front-runner status in 1979 before winning the 1980 Republican presidential nomination as an example. Greenberg notes that William Mayer, a political scientist at Northeastern University, discovered that in contested primary races since 1980, of the eight front-runners who polled at 34 percent or higher in the September before the election, six won the nomination, and none of the five front-runners who polled below that percentage won.

=== Debates ===
Primary debate participation may hinder a front-runner's chance to be nominated.

Debate analysts and scholars recognize that the front-runner is often attacked more frequently by the other candidates. (Note: An "attack" is defined as "any negative explicit mention of another candidate and/or his ideas.") It is a common strategy of the front-runner's opponents, especially for long shot candidates. During the December 2, 1999 Republican primary debate, almost all attacks were directed against the front-runner George W. Bush. Long shot candidates Gary Bauer, Orrin Hatch and Alan Keyes significantly contributed to the mass attack. In a debate featuring the 1988 Democratic primary candidates, long shot candidates "gang[ed] up" on the front-runner. Analysis on a 1992 primary debate showed that the front-runner received the most attacks.

However, excessively attacking the front-runner can hurt one's image and support from viewers. In the December 2, 1999 Republican primary debate, all 10 of Steve Forbes' attacks were made against George W. Bush, contributing to over half of the total attacks that targeted Bush. Steve Forbes experienced a negative effect on his image and lost all support he had from a sample of 91 viewers before the debate. Although reasons other than excessive attacking may have contributed to Forbes' decline, viewers had "a clear negative reaction to his constant attack of Bush." John McCain, who made no attacks, had his image improved and his support from the viewers increased. This suggests that a front-runner's opponent may be more successful if they "attack in moderation." It may also suggest that if the opponent is recognized by viewers as a "legitimate contender," they can benefit from refraining from attacks and "permitting the larger field of [long shot candidates] to do the dirty work of attacking a front-runner." This would allow the opponent to project "a more positive message" about their ideas.

== See also ==
- Presumptive nominee
