= Robert Wickliffe =

Robert Wickliffe may refer to:

- Robert C. Wickliffe (1819–1895), 15th Governor of Louisiana, 1856–1860
- Robert Charles Wickliffe (1874–1912), his son, U.S. Representative for Louisiana, 1909–1912

== See also ==
- Robert Wickliffe Woolley (1871–1958), American Democratic politician from Washington D.C.
