= 1926 United States Senate election in Nevada =

- November 2, 1926
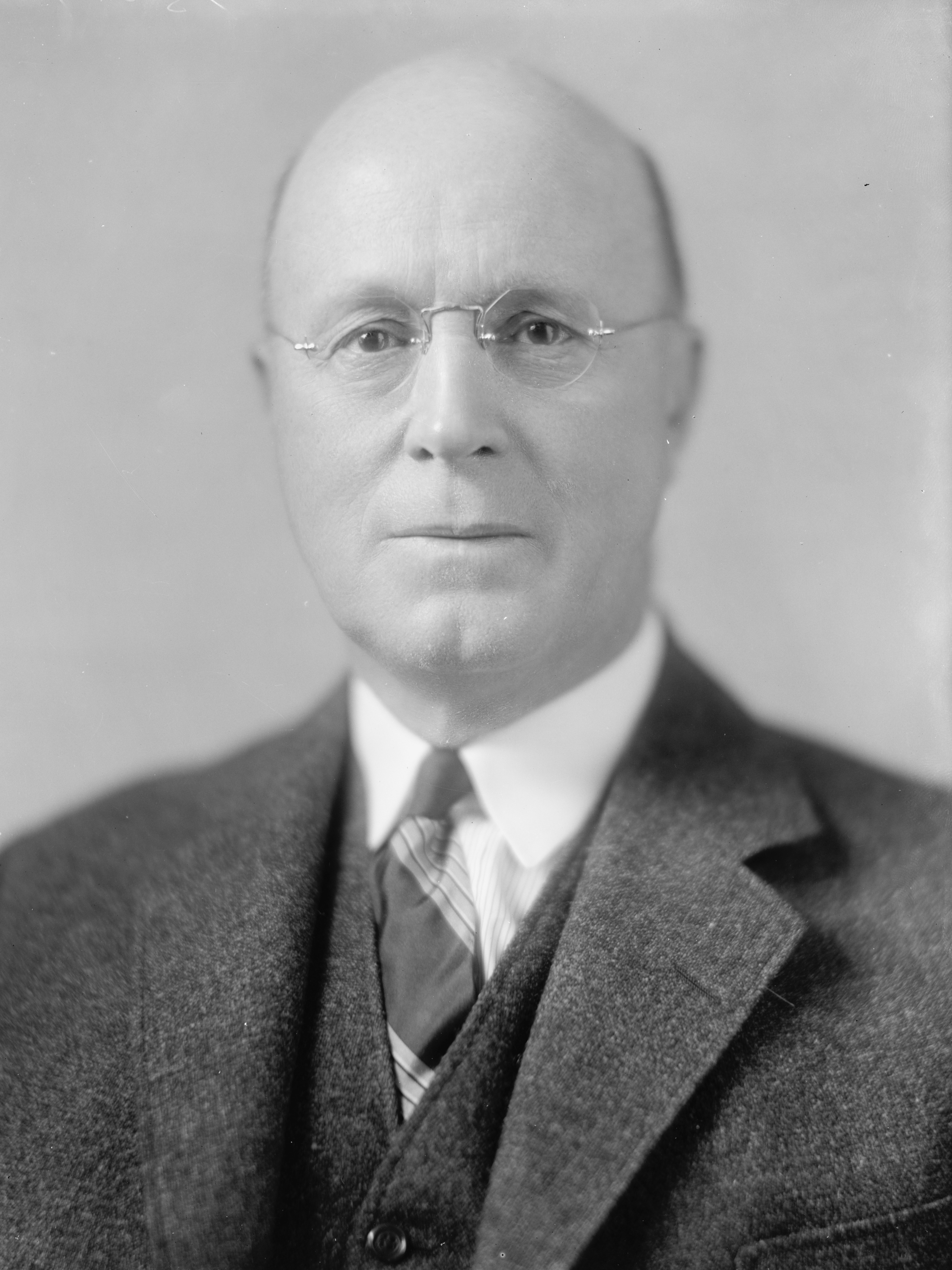

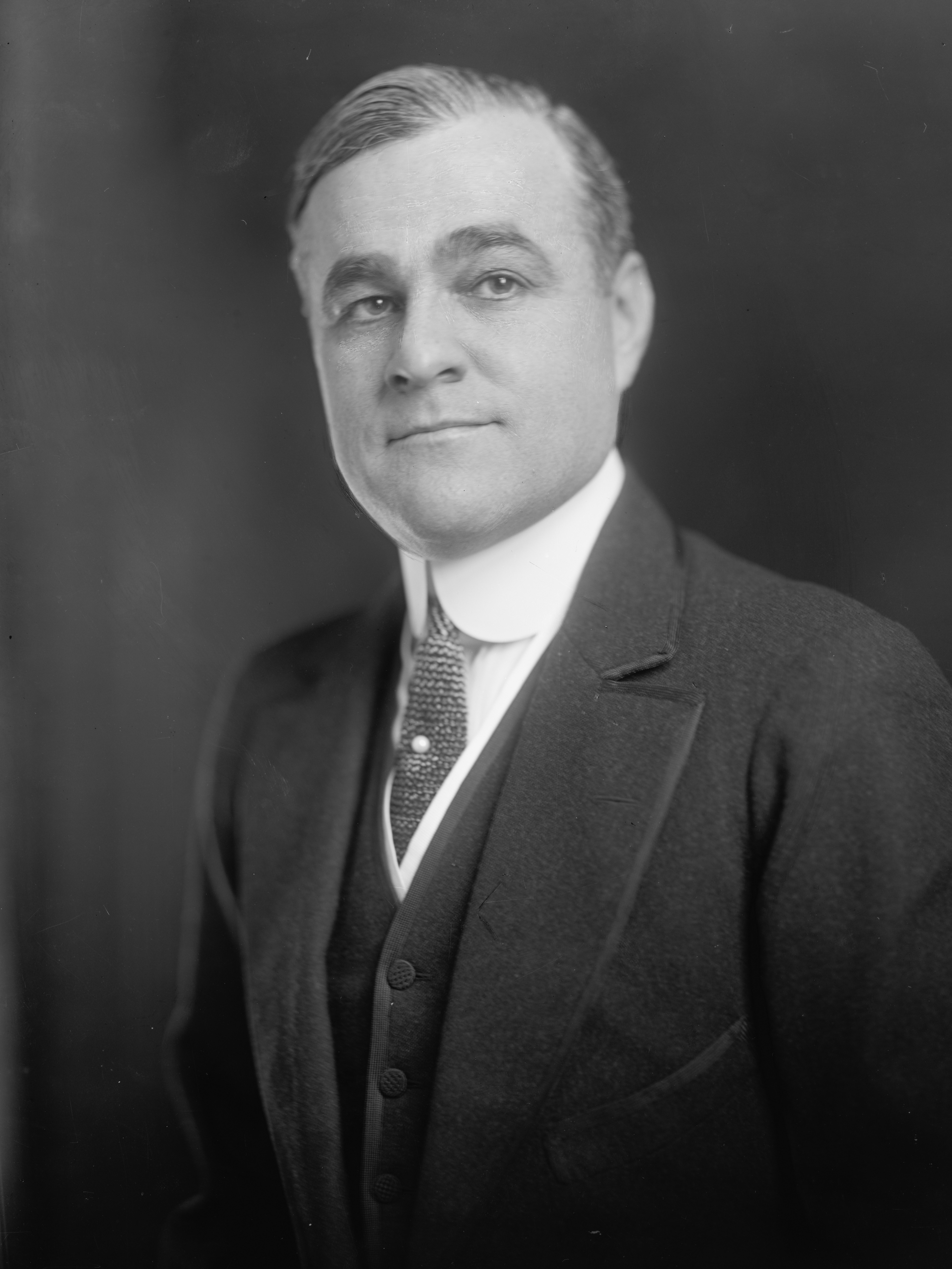
Nominee	Tasker Oddie	Raymond T. Baker
Party	Republican	Democratic
Popular vote	17,430	13,273
Percentage	55.78%	42.48%
- County results Oddie: 50–60% 60–70% 70–80% Baker: 50–60%
U.S. senator before election
Tasker Oddie
Republican
Elected U.S. Senator
Tasker Oddie
Republican

The 1926 United States Senate election in Nevada took place on November 2, 1926. Incumbent Republican Senator Tasker Oddie won re-election to a second term against Raymond T. Baker, the former Director of the United States Mint.

== Primary elections ==
Primary elections were held on September 7, 1926.

=== Democratic primary ===
==== Candidates ====
- Raymond T. Baker, former Director of the United States Mint (1917-1922)
- Pat McCarran, former Chief Justice of the Supreme Court of Nevada (1917-1919)
- C. H. McIntosh, former Secretary of the Nevada State Senate (1903-1907)
- William H. Brennan

==== Results ====
Democratic primary results
Party	Candidate	Votes	%
Democratic	Raymond T. Baker	4,732	49.86
Democratic	Pat McCarran	2,755	29.03
Democratic	C. H. McIntosh	1,153	12.15
Democratic	William H. Brennan	850	8.96
Total votes		9,490	

=== Republican primary ===
==== Candidates ====
- Tasker Oddie, incumbent U.S. Senator
- Edwin E. Roberts, mayor of Reno, Nevada (1923-1933) and candidate for this seat in the 1918 special election

==== Results ====
Republican primary results
Party	Candidate	Votes	%
Republican	Tasker Oddie (incumbent)	8,512	68.57
Republican	Edwin E. Roberts	3,902	31.43
Total votes		12,414	

== General election ==
=== Results ===
1926 United States Senate election in Nevada
Party	Candidate	Votes	%
Republican	Tasker Oddie (incumbent)	17,430	55.78
Democratic	Raymond T. Baker	13,273	42.48
Independent	George A. Bice	543	1.74
Majority		4,157	13.30
Turnout		31,246	
Republican hold			
