= Raymond T. Baker =

Director of the US Mint (1917–1922)

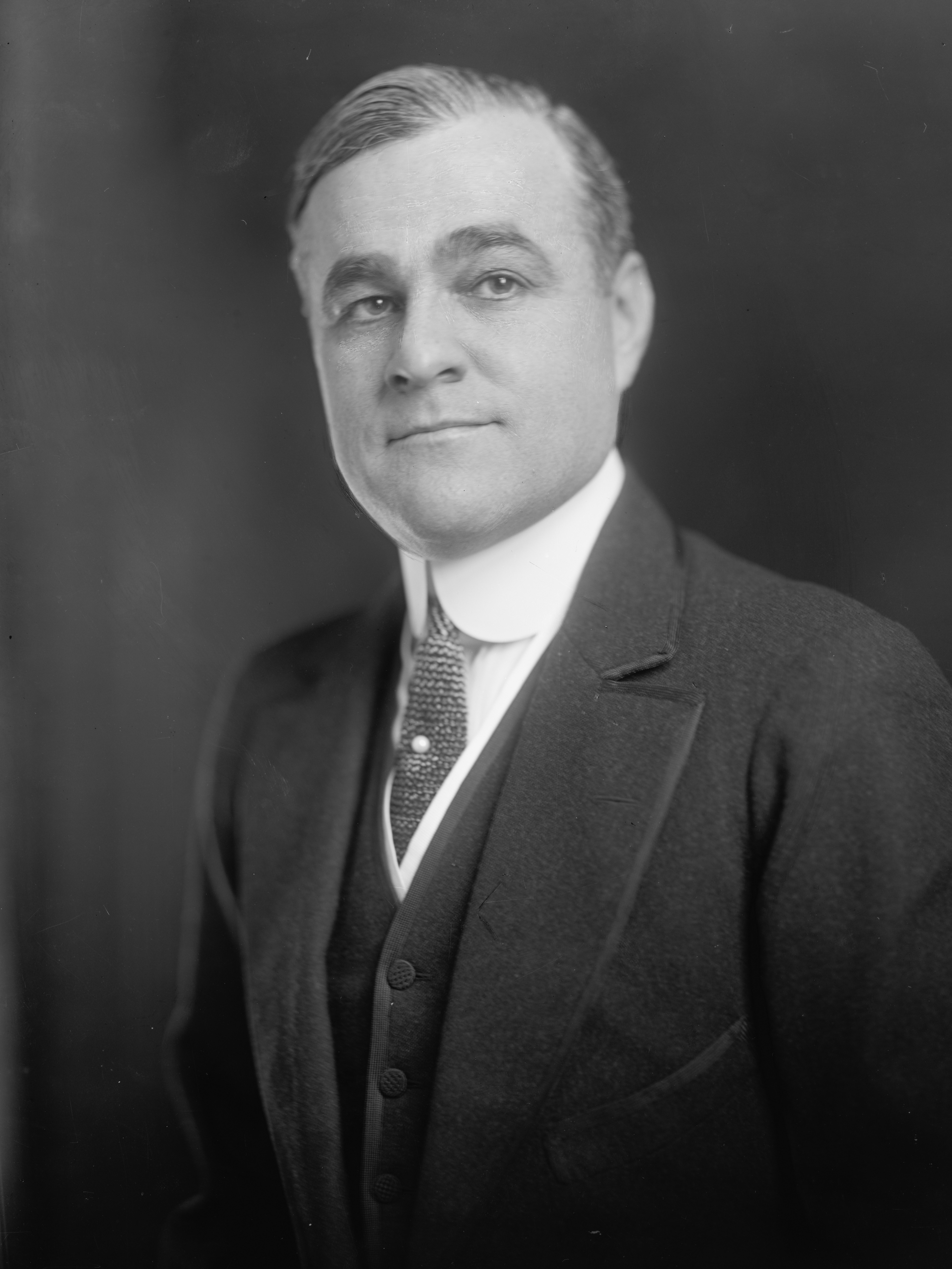

Director of the United States Mint
- In office March 1917 – March 1922
- President: Woodrow Wilson; Warren Harding
- Preceded by: Friedrich Johannes Hugo von Engelken
- Succeeded by: Frank Edgar Scobey

Personal details
- Born: Raymond Thomas Baker; November 22, 1878 Eureka, Nevada, U.S.
- Died: April 28, 1935 (aged 56) Washington, D.C., U.S.
- Party: Democratic
- Spouses: Margaret Emerson Vanderbilt (m. 1918; div. 1928) Delphine Ione Dodge Cromwell (after 1928)
- Children: Gloria Mary Baker; Anna Ray Baker
- Parent(s): George Washington Baker; Mary Agnes Hall Baker
- Education: University of Nevada, Reno; Stanford University

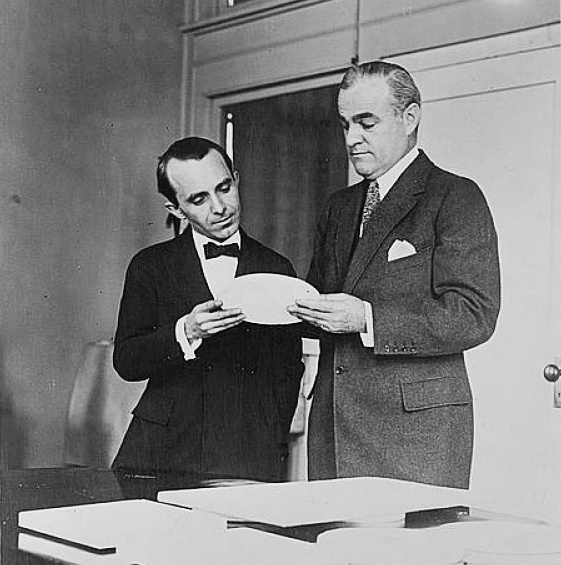
Raymond T. Baker and Anthony de Francisci inspecting model of new silver dollar.

Raymond Thomas Baker (November 22, 1878 – April 28, 1935) was an American businessman and government official who was Director of the United States Mint from 1917 to 1922.

== Early life ==
Baker was born in Eureka, Nevada on November 22, 1877. He was the son of George Washington Baker, the lead counsel of the Southern Pacific Railroad, and Mary Agnes (née Hall) Baker. His brother Cleve Baker served as the Nevada Attorney General.

He was educated at the University of Nevada, Reno, then at Stanford University.

== Career ==
After college, Baker became involved in gold mining, being one of the first investors active in Rawhide, Nevada. He became a rich man when he sold his claims. He then moved east and had a brief romantic relationship with Elinor Glyn. Baker had a longtime interest in prison reform and in 1911, with his brother, Cleve Baker, serving as Nevada Attorney General, Raymond T. Baker became warden of the Nevada State Prison, a position he held from February 1, 1911 to May 10, 1912.

In 1915, Baker traveled to Russia to become confidential secretary to George T. Marye, Jr., the United States Ambassador to Russia. While in the diplomatic service, "he carried out one of the longest messenger trips on record, coming to Washington with dispatches from Ambassador Marye by way of Finland and England, and then returning, after a two or three days' stop at the capital, to Petrograd by way of California and Siberia.

Upon his return from Russia, President Woodrow Wilson named him Director of the United States Mint in 1917. Baker subsequently held this office from March 1917 until March 1922.

During the 1926 Senate elections, Baker sought election as United States Senator from Nevada on the Democratic ticket, but was defeated by the Republican incumbent, Tasker Oddie.

== Personal life ==
On June 12, 1918, he married Margaret Emerson Vanderbilt (1886–1960) at Homewood in Lenox, Massachusetts. Margaret, the daughter and heiress of Isaac Edward Emerson (the "Bromo-Seltzer King") was the widow of Alfred Gwynne Vanderbilt, who died aboard the RMS Lusitania. At the wedding, his best man was U.S. Senator Key Pittman. Before their divorce on October 1, 1928 in Reno after a decade of marriage, they were the parents of:

- Gloria Mary Baker (1920–1975), who married Henry Junkins Topping (1914–1968) in 1938. They divorced and she married Edward Harrison Alexander (1902–1978) in 1944. They also divorced and she married Sidney Taylor (1934–2004) in 1966.

After their divorce, Margaret remarried to Charles Minot Amory in October 1928. On December 4, 1928, he married a second time, to Delphine (née Dodge) Cromwell (1899–1943), daughter of Anna Thompson Dodge and Horace Elgin Dodge, one of the two co-founders of the Dodge Motor Company. Delphine was the ex-wife of James H. R. Cromwell, who married Doris Duke in 1935. Together, Raymond and Delphine were the parents of:

- Anna Ray Baker (1933–2001), who married James Ranger.

Baker died of coronary thrombosis on April 28, 1935, In Washington, DC approximately three months after suffering a heart attack. He was cremated, and his ashes interred with his family at Mountain View Cemetery, in Oakland, California. After his death, his widow remarried to Timothy Godde in August 1935.

Party political offices
Preceded by Charles Henderson	Democratic nominee for U.S. Senator from Nevada (Class 3); 1926	Succeeded by Pat McCarran
Government offices
Preceded by Friedrich Johannes Hugo von Engelken	Director of the United States Mint; March 1917 – March 1922	Succeeded by Frank Edgar Scobey
