= Friedrich Johannes Hugo von Engelken =

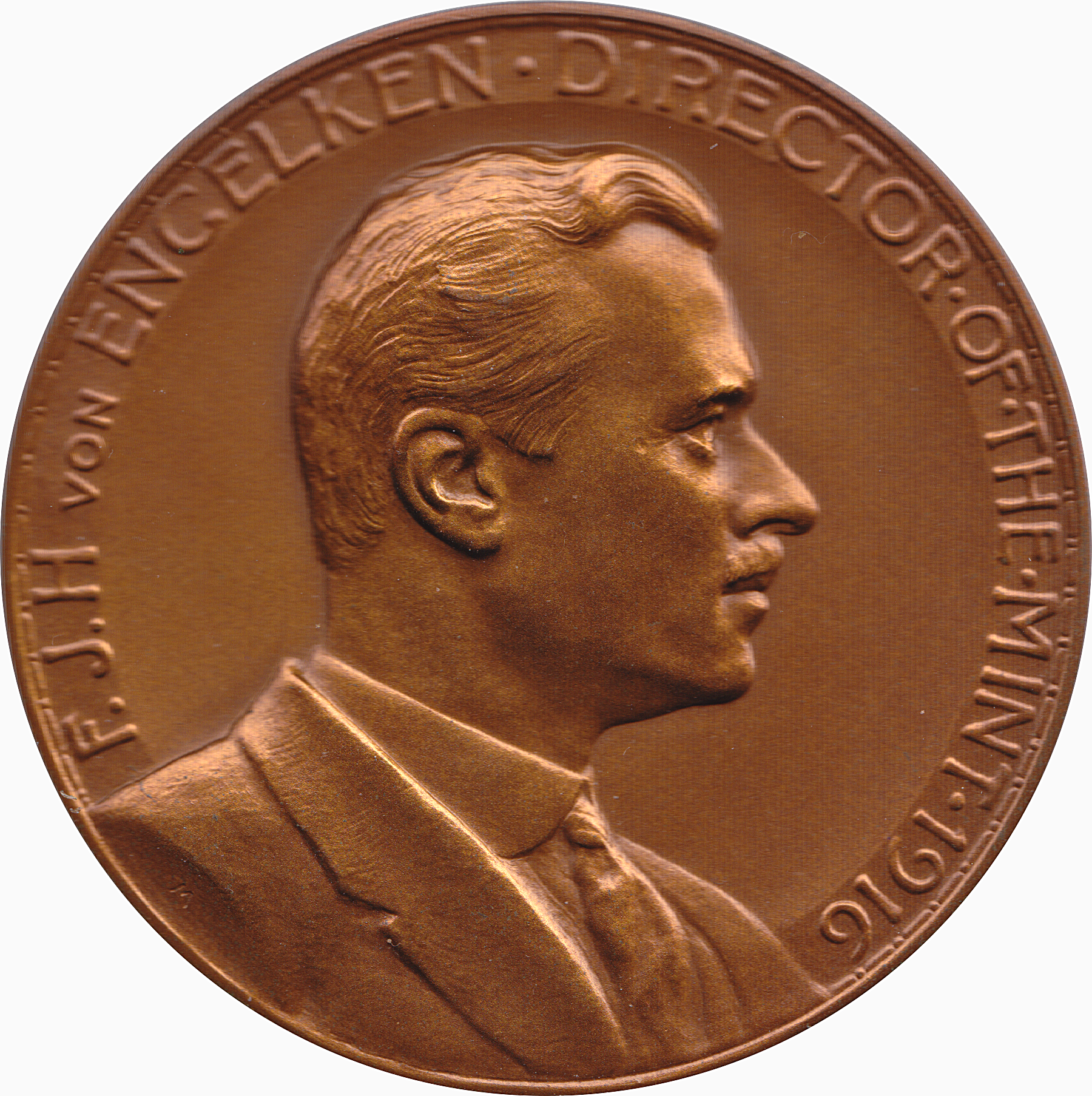
- Mint Director Friedrich Johannes Hugo von Engelken. Seen on his Mint medal designed by George T. Morgan.

Director of the United States Mint
- In office September 1916 – March 1917
- President: Woodrow Wilson
- Preceded by: Robert W. Woolley
- Succeeded by: Raymond T. Baker

Friedrich Johannes Hugo "F. H." von Engelken (April 26, 1881 – February 12, 1963) was an American government official who was Director of the United States Mint from 1916 to 1917.

== Biography ==
F. H. von Engelken was reportedly born in Denmark or Germany on April 26, 1881. His parents were Lousi H. von Engelken and Emilie (née Döderlein) von Engelken. He later moved to Florida. He married Louisiana Breckenridge Hart Gibson in 1906.

In 1908, President Theodore Roosevelt appointed Engelken a member of the American Commission, which studied rural credits in Western Europe. Engelken authored a minority report that later was incorporated into the Federal Farm Loan Act of 1916, which created the Farm Credit System.

In 1916, President Woodrow Wilson named Engelken Director of the United States Mint. He held this office from September 1916 to March 1917.

In 1917, Engelken became president of the Federal Land Bank of the Third District. He later became head of bond sales for the Farm Loan Board.

Toward the end of World War I, United States Secretary of War Newton D. Baker recommended that Engelken be commissioned a major of engineers. In 1919, he traveled to Europe to report on economic conditions.

His first wife Louisiana died in New York on November 11, 1935. He married Helen Haines Cabell of Boston in New York on May 20, 1937. They subsequently divorced in Florida in 1952. Engelken married a third time to Miss Kate Walton of Palatka; she survived him.

Engelken died in Palatka, Florida on February 12, 1963. He and his wife Kate are buried at Oak Hill East Cemetery in Palatka.

Government offices
Preceded by Robert W. Woolley	Director of the United States Mint; September 1916 – March 1917	Succeeded by Raymond T. Baker
