= Robert W. Woolley =

American Democratic politician

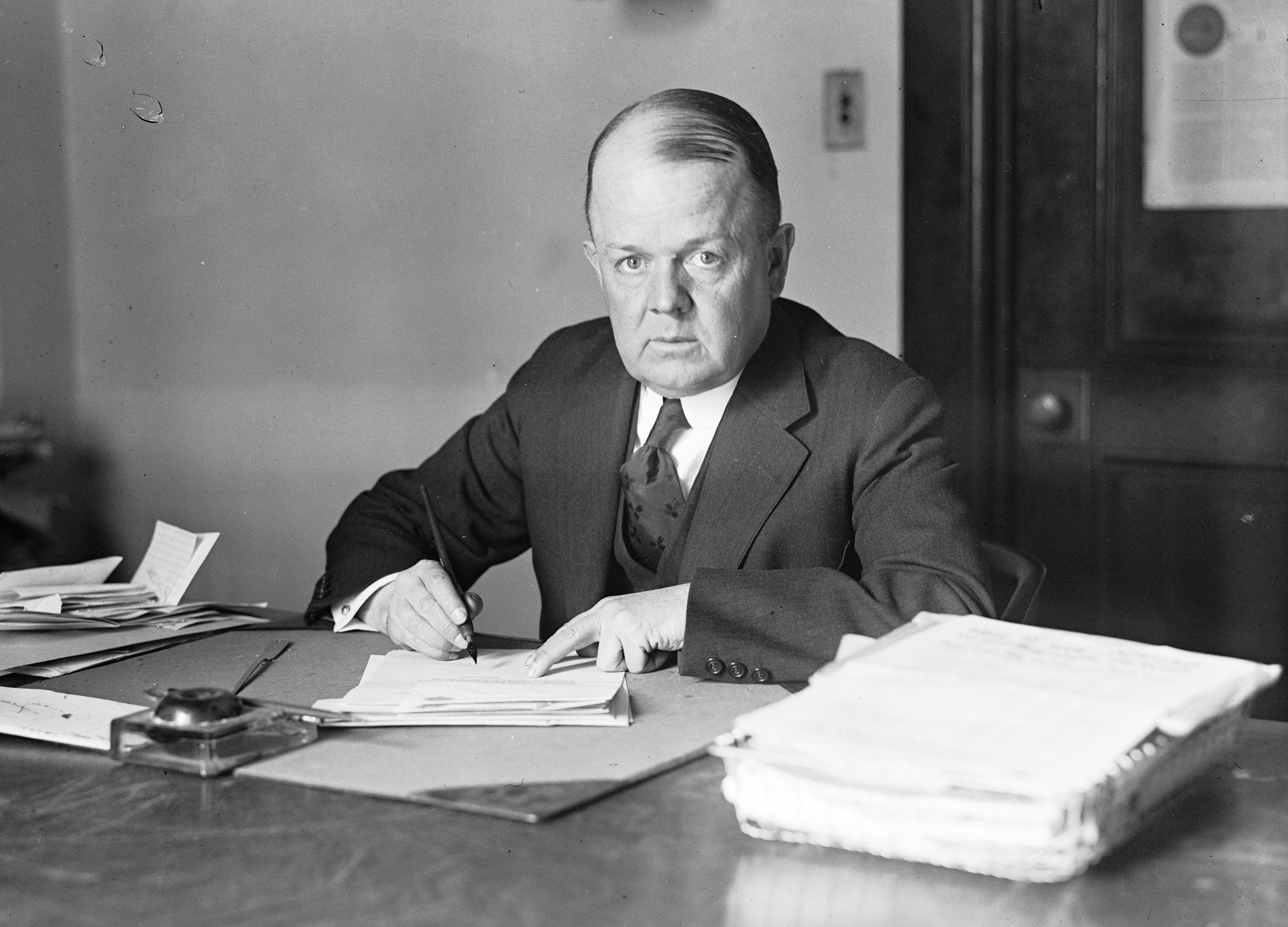

Director of the United States Mint
- In office 1915–1916

Personal details
- Born: Robert Wickliffe Woolley; April 29, 1871 Lexington, Kentucky, United States
- Died: December 15, 1958 (aged 87) Frankfort, Kentucky, United States
- Party: Democratic

Robert Wickliffe Woolley (April 29, 1871 – December 15, 1958) was an American Democratic politician from Washington D.C. He was Director of the United States Mint from 1915 to 1916, and a member of the Interstate Commerce Commission in 1920. He was a critic of American fuel consumption.

== Biography ==
He was born on April 29, 1871, in Lexington, Kentucky, to Franklin Waters Woolley (1845–1891) and the former Lucy McCaw (1844–1905). He married Marguerite Holmes Trenholm (1878–1936) in 1900 and had four daughters, Marguerite Trenholm Woolley (1901–1983), Lucy DeGraffenried (Woolley) List (1902–1993), Florence Trenholm Wickliffe (Woolley) McKee (1905–1997) and Frances Howard (Wolley) Robb (1914–2003). Frances was the mother of future governor of Virginia Charles S. Robb and mother-in-law of future first lady Lynda Bird Johnson Robb.

He was Director of the United States Mint from 1915 to 1916.

During President Wilson's 1916 reelection bid, Woolley was the chairman of the Bureau of Publicity for the Democratic National Committee and was credited with the successful slogan "He Has Kept Us Out of the War."

He was a member of the Interstate Commerce Commission in 1920.

He died on December 15, 1958, in Frankfort, Kentucky.

Government offices
Preceded by George E. Roberts	Director of the United States Mint; March 1915 – July 1916	Succeeded by Friedrich Johannes Hugo von Engelken
