= Michael "Miles" Standish =

American businessman (1964–2023)

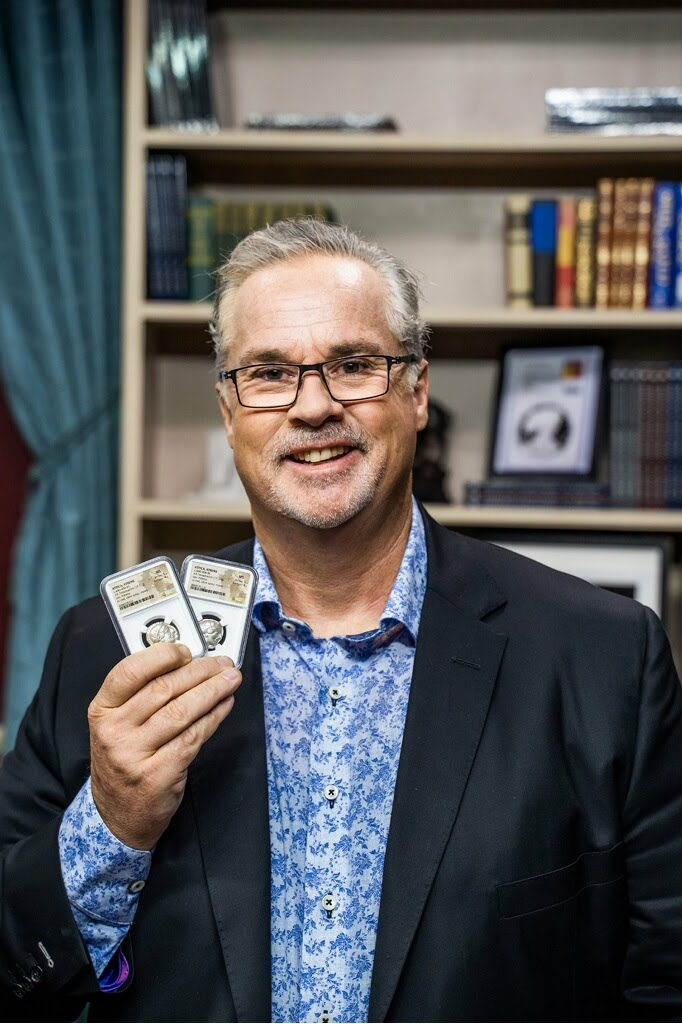
- Born: November 13, 1964; Kalamazoo, Michigan
- Died: July 11, 2023 (aged 58)
- Occupations: Author, vice president of NGC, rare coin expert – numismatist – (coin authenticator and grader)
- Employer: NGC (Numismatic Guaranty Corporation)
- Spouse: Andrea Mangione Standish
- Awards: U.S. Mint Director's Coin of Excellence

Michael "Miles" Standish (November 13, 1964 – July 11, 2023) was an American businessman, author, rare coin expert, sports memorabilia expert and philanthropist. He was a co-founder of Collectors Universe and served as vice president of the Numismatic Guaranty Corporation (NGC).

== Early life and education ==
Born in Kalamazoo, Michigan, on November 13, 1964, Standish became interested in numismatics at a young age. He was a 1983 graduate of Portage Central High School in Portage, Michigan, where he lettered in football and was a disc jockey at the school radio station. Standish first became involved in selling coins at the age of 17, when he set up a table at the National Silver Dollar Show (1982) in Houston, Texas.

== Career ==
Standish began his career in the coin industry as he traveled to regional and local coin shows. He was hired by ANACS, America's oldest grading service, to be a grader in 1984. While at ANACS, Standish began to write a monthly column called "Under the Loupe", which was published in Coin World from 1984 until 1988.

Standish left ANACS in 1985 and went to work for Michael G. DeFalco, a dealer specializing in silver dollars, toned coins, and commemoratives. He also worked for Wayne Miller and Steve Contursi, where he served as a coin buyer. It was at about this time that Standish got the nickname "Miles", a humorous reference to Myles Standish, the Plymouth Colony captain. Standish credited the origin of the nickname to then American Numismatic Association President Florence M. Schook.

In January 1987, Standish joined PCGS and was the first full-time coin grader in the company's history. He became part owner in the company in 1995. In 2004 Standish received notoriety for the detection of an impostor coin. "Someone had taken a 1945 cent (which was made of copper alloy) and altered the '5' in the date to resemble a '3.' Expert authenticator Miles Standish...needed only seconds to spot the alteration and pass the news along to the coin's now crestfallen owner. Instead of being rare and worth a small fortune, the coin was just an ordinary cent." Standish also spoke out about a rare dime-penny that was discovered in 2000.

In 2005, Standish left PCGS to become vice chairman and chief numismatist of ANACS. Standish left ANACS in September 2006 and returned to PCGS, where he served as vice president.

In 2015, Standish joined NGC and served as their vice president.

== Numismatics ==
Standish was one of American numismatics' most recognized graders and authenticators of coins. He was the first full-time coin grader at Professional Coin Grading Service. In the course of his career, Standish graded between 1,000,000 and 2,000,000 coins, including a number of significant rarities, such as the 1913 Liberty nickels and all of the 1804 dollars.

While with PCGS, Standish developed a number of marketing innovations, including PCGS’ bulk submission and First Strike programs, the company's signature series of PCGS inserts which include autographs of notable figures such as Presidents George H. Bush and Gerald Ford, U.S. Mint Directors Donna Pope, Jay W. Johnson, and Philip Diehl, Edmund Moy, Chief Engraver John Mercanti, General Tommy Franks and Hall of Fame baseball player Nolan Ryan.

In 2011, for his service to numismatics and to the U.S. Mint, Standish was awarded the "Director’s Coin for Excellence" by the director of the United States Mint, Edmund Moy.

== Sports collectibles ==
Standish served as Vice President of Professional Sports Authenticator (PSA) and launched PSA/DNA First autograph Sammy Sosa- authentication from 1996 to 2001. During that time, Standish authenticated a number of high-profile sports items including Mark McGwire’s 70th home run ball and Henry Aaron’s 715th home run bat and ball. In 2014, Standish merged his passion for sports and numismatics by offering a series of limited edition PCGS-graded coin inserts, featuring the signatures of members of the National Baseball Hall of Fame.

== Author ==
In 2014, Standish authored Morgan Dollar: America's Love Affair with a Legendary Coin. It was recognized as a Best Specialized book in the 2015 Annual NLG (Numismatic Literary Guild) Writers' Awards. In 2012, he co-authored "American Silver Eagles: A Guide to the U.S. Bullion Coin Program" with former Chief Engraver of the U.S. Mint, John Mercanti.

From 1984 to 1988, Standish wrote a monthly column titled "Under the Loupe" for Coin World.

== Personal life ==
Standish was a participant in a non-profit organization that works with hospitals and healthcare providers to instill family and child friendly healthcare practices around the world. Standish's wife Andrea Mangione Standish is the founder and president.

Among many other awards and accomplishments, Standish was awarded the honor of The Commission of Kentucky Colonel. This is the highest title of honor bestowed by the Governor of Kentucky, and a recognition of an individual's noteworthy accomplishments and outstanding service to the community, state, and nation. Standish was among many other notable Kentucky Colonels, including Colonel Harlan Sanders, President Ronald Reagan, Winston Churchill, John Lennon, Donald Trump Jr., Betty White, Paul McCarthy, Ansel Adams, Muhammad Ali, Arthur Ashe, Mario Andretti, and Pope Benedict XVI, to name a few.

== Philanthropy ==
Standish was very active in philanthropic activities, from doing fun events like "Shave Miles" where he will allow celebrities and others to shave his head to raise money for the Standish Foundation for Child & Family Centered Healthcare and the American Numismatic Association.

Standish also established a quarter-million-dollar trust fund to benefit education and sports programs at his alma mater, Portage Central High School.

== Death ==
Standish died on July 11, 2023, in Austin, Texas.
