= Louisiana's 104th House of Representatives district =

American legislative district

Louisiana's 104th State House of Representatives district
Representative
Jack William Gallé, Jr. R–Mandeville

Louisiana's 104th House of Representatives district is one of 105 Louisiana House of Representatives districts. It is currently held by Republican Jack William Gallé Jr.

== Geography ==
HD104 includes a portion of the cities of Slidell, Covington, and all of Lacombe.

== Election results ==
Year	Winning candidate	Party	Percent	Opponent	Party	Percent
1999	Tommy Warner	Democratic	Cancelled			
2003	Nita Hutter	Republican	61%	Mike Bayham	Republican	39%
2007	Nita Hutter	Republican	69%	Stacy Riley, Sr.	Democratic	31%
2011	Paul Hollis	Republican	55.8%	Christopher Trahan	Republican	44.2%
2015	Paul Hollis	Republican	Cancelled			
2019	Paul Hollis	Republican	Cancelled			
2023	Jay Gallé	Republican	64.4%	John Raymond	Republican	35.6%
