= Margaret Kelly =

Margaret Kelly may refer to:

- Margaret Kelly (civil servant), acting director of the United States Mint by 1911
- Margaret B. Kelly (born 1935), American accountant and politician from Missouri
- Margaret Kelly (dancer) (1910–2004), Irish dancer and the founder of the Bluebell Girls dance troupe
- Margaret Kelly (swimmer) (born 1956), British swimmer
- Margaret Kelly (pharmacologist) (1906–1968), American pharmacologist
- Margaret Skillion (née Kelly), sister of Australian bushrangers Ned Kelly and Dan Kelly
- Margaret Kelly, first wife of Bill Murray
