= Philip Diehl =

Philip Diehl may refer to:

- Philip Diehl (inventor) (1847–1913), German-American engineer and inventor
- Philip N. Diehl, director of the United States Mint
- Phillip Diehl, American baseball player
