= David J. Ryder =

American government official (born 1955)

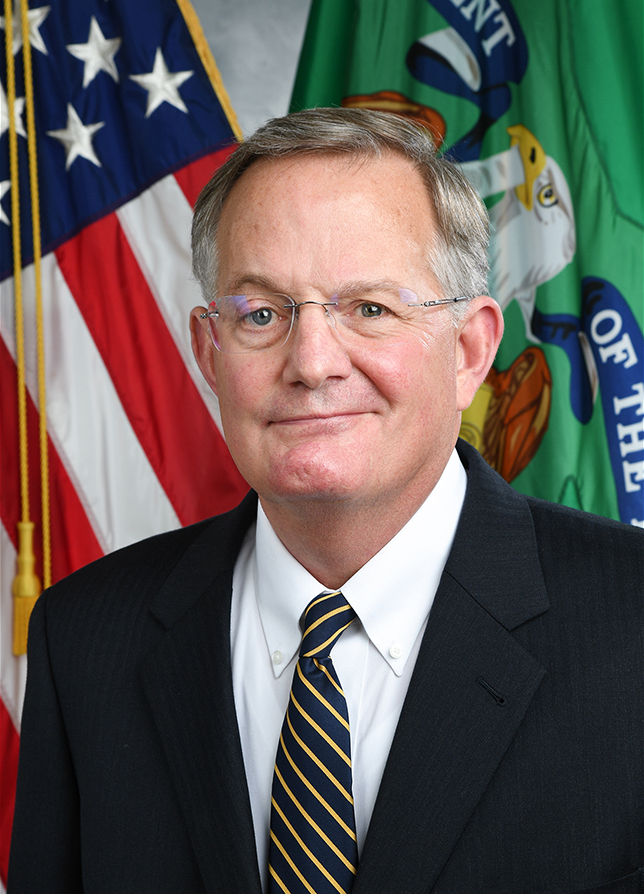

34th and 39th Director of the United States Mint
- In office April 12, 2018 – October 1, 2021
- President: Donald Trump; Joe Biden
- Preceded by: Richard A. Peterson (acting)
- Succeeded by: Ventris Gibson
- In office September 1992 – November 24, 1993
- President: George H. W. Bush; Bill Clinton
- Preceded by: Donna Pope
- Succeeded by: Philip N. Diehl

Personal details
- Born: October 14, 1955 (age 69); Billings, Montana, U.S.
- Education: Boise State University

David J. Ryder (born October 14, 1955) is an American government official. He was the Director of the United States Mint from 1992 to 1993, and returned to the position from 2018 to 2021.

== Early life and education ==
David J. Ryder was born in Billings, Montana on October 14, 1955. Raised in Boise, Idaho, he attended Boise State University.

== Career ==
Ryder worked for the United States Department of Commerce as deputy commissioner general of the U.S. Pavilion at the 1984 Louisiana World Exposition 1983–84, and then commissioner general 1984–85. From 1985 to 1986, he worked in the Office of the Vice President of the United States as Director of Advance. He was director of operations for TCOM Systems, Inc. from 1986 to 1988.

He was director of operations of the 1988 Republican National Convention. After George H. W. Bush won the 1988 U.S. presidential election, Ryder was director of management and operations for Bush's transition team. From 1989 to 1990, he was Deputy Chief of Staff of the Office of the Vice President of the United States. From 1990 to 1991, he was Deputy Treasurer of the United States.

In 1991, President Bush nominated Ryder to be Director of the United States Mint and he subsequently held this office from September 1992 to November 1993 via a recess appointment.

Ryder joined Secure Products, a corporate venture "spin-off" of the Sarnoff Corporation, launched in 1994. In 2007 the Honeywell Corporation acquired Secure Products where Ryder held the position of Global Business Development Manager and managing director of Currency for Honeywell Authentication Technologies. Both Secure Products and Honeywell developed and launched highly advanced anti-counterfeiting systems for both manual and high-speed authentication of currency, passports, bank checks, and other commercial products. Ryder worked closely with Honeywell's technical team in the development and issuance of 18 United States patents.

In 2017, Ryder was again nominated as Director of the United States Mint by President Donald Trump and confirmed by a voice vote on March 21, 2018.

In 2021, Ryder was named one of Coin World's Most Influential People in Numismatics (1960-2020). Ryder announced on September 24, 2021, that he would resign as Mint director, effective October 1.

=== Second Tenure as Mint Director ===
During Ryder's second tenure as Mint director, he implemented a wide range of new programs and significant changes at the Mint that increased demand for the Mint's products and was a challenge to keep up with, especially since the start of the COVID-19 pandemic in 2020. The pandemic required changes in coin manufacturing procedures, including temporary shutdowns, to keep employees safe.

The Mint generated complaints from some coin collectors for its sale of high-demand coins with strict mintage limits—products which have been sold by the Mint for many years and which were expanded during Ryder's tenure. The strong secondary market performance of those products led to a sharp increase in demand for similar Mint products, which put increased pressure on the Mint's order management system and led the Mint to implemenent changes such as blocking the use of bots to place orders and increasing the use of product enrollments.

In November 2019, the Mint sold an Enhanced Reverse Proof 2019-S Silver Eagle, which sold out within 20 minutes of release. In November 2020, the Mint sold special 75th Anniversary of World War II Silver Eagle and Gold Eagle proof coins, with mintage limits of 75,000 and 1,945 coins, respectively.

The sale of both coins generated backlash from those Mint customers and collectors who were unable to successfully place orders. Mint officials acknowledged that the unusually high volume of traffic on their website and the use of bots created problems for buyers of these coins, and dealers found ways to legally circumvent the household order limit of one coin.

The Mint released 2021 100th anniversary Morgan and Peace dollars that were not technically commemorative coins and were authorized under legislation that lacks a sunset provision, which allows them to be issued on an ongoing basis. The first two of these coins, released on May 24, 2021, sold out within minutes, and feedback from collectors about the original household limit led the Mint to postpone releasing the remaining dollars in the program from June 1 and 7 until August 3 and 10 and to reduce the order limit from 10 to 3.

Towards the end of 2021, Mint officials indicated they were developing plans to continue issuing the silver dollars "in future years in various finishes struck at branch mints."

In April 2022, US Mint officials said that sales of the 2021 silver dollars "brought in lots of pre-existing Morgan and Peace collectors who normally only collect older American coins" and that as a result of that program and other 2021 coin programs, the Mint added a total of 166,217 new customers that year.

Ryder's tenure also resulted in a major improvement in the Mint's financial situation with sales of numismatic products in 2021 rising 66% from $346 million to $577 million in revenue—the best in nine years.

During his tenure, Ryder was also responsible for a major change to the Mint's flagship silver and gold coin series, the American Silver Eagle and the American Gold Eagle, which both saw the introduction of new reverse designs for the first time since 1986 that were designed respectively by Emily Damstra and Jennie Norris. The design change was made as a result of Ryder's request to Treasury Secretary Steven Mnuchin. The design change also include new anti-counterfeting features on both coins that are both overt and covert.

Sales of bullion coins in 2021 were the best in over 20 years "almost doubling in total revenue from $2.1 billion in 2020 to $3.8 billion in 2021," including an increase in total ounces sold for Gold Eagles of 70.5% and Silver Eagles of 62.4% compared to the prior year.

Ryder also appointed the Mint's 14th Chief Engraver Joseph Menna in February 2019—the first person to serve in the position since the 2010 retirement of John M. Mercanti.

Government offices
Preceded by Donna Pope	Director of the United States Mint; 1992–1993	Succeeded by Philip N. Diehl
Preceded by Edmund C. Moy	Director of the United States Mint; 2018–2021	Succeeded by Ventris Gibson
