= Ventris Gibson =

American government official

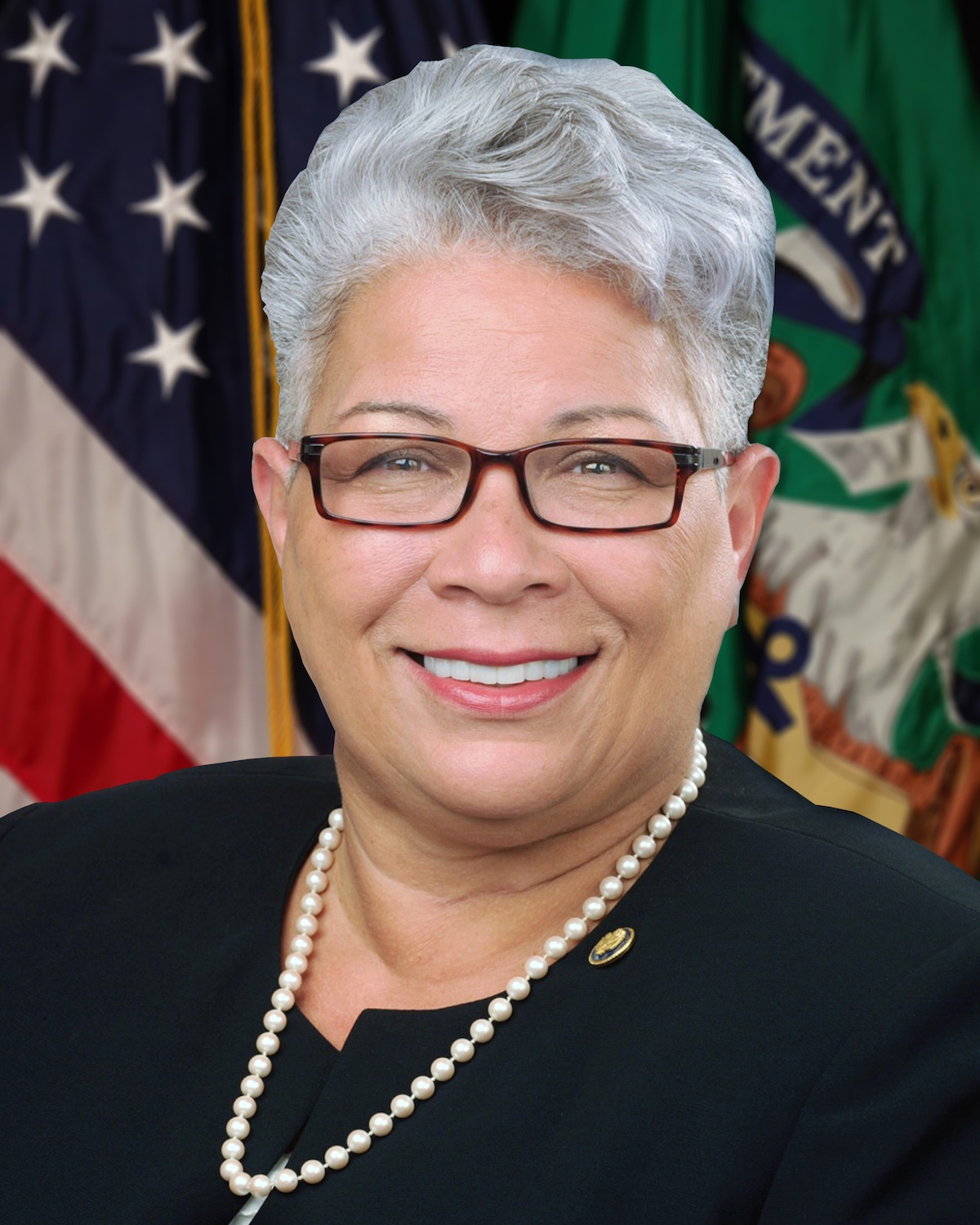

Director of the United States Mint
- In office: June 22, 2022; Acting: October 25, 2021 – June 22, 2022; –: March 31, 2025
- President: Joe Biden; Donald Trump
- Preceded by: David J. Ryder
- Succeeded by: Paul Hollis

Personal details
- Born: March 22, 1956 (age 69) Roseland, Virginia, U.S.

Military service
- Branch/service: United States Navy

Ventris Cassandra Gibson (born March 22, 1956) is an American government official. She served as the director of the United States Mint from October 2021 until March 2025. She previously served as deputy director of the Mint from October 2021 until her confirmation by the U.S. Senate.

== Education ==
Gibson attended the University of Maryland Global Campus.

== Career ==
Gibson began her career in the United States Navy. She later joined the United States Department of Veterans Affairs, serving as director of the Office of Human Resources Management from 1996 to 1998 and deputy assistant secretary for human resources management from 1998 to 2003. During her tenure, Gibson participated in an investigation into allegations of sexual harassment at the Fayetteville Veterans Administration Hospital. She served as chief human capital officer of the Federal Aviation Administration from 2003 to 2010.

In 2012 and 2013, Gibson worked as a consultant at North Highland. She later joined the National Labor Relations Board, serving as acting chief human capital officer in 2013 and director of administration until 2014. From 2014 to 2015, she served as associate deputy assistant secretary of the United States Department of Health and Human Services for human resources. She served as director of the District of Columbia Department of Human Resources from 2015 to 2021. In 2021, Gibson was elected as a fellow of the National Academy of Public Administration.

=== United States Mint ===
In October 2021, Gibson joined the United States Mint as deputy director and acting director.

On December 13, 2021, President Joe Biden nominated Gibson to serve as permanent director of the mint.

On June 15, 2022, the United States Senate confirmed Gibson in a voice vote. During her tenure, to alleviate web traffic issues during high profile product launches, the Mint launched a "waiting room" to prevent crashes.

On October 30, 2024, the Mint launched a redesigned website.

Gibson announced her retirement on March 20, 2025, effective at the end of the month, after being asked to step down by the Trump administration.
