= Charles W. Pitman =

American politician

Charles Wesley Pitman (ca. 1816 – June 8, 1871) was a Whig member of the U.S. House of Representatives from Pennsylvania.

He was born in New Jersey. He graduated from Dickinson College in Carlisle, Pennsylvania, in 1838. He moved to Pottsville, Pennsylvania, the same year and conducted a school for boys, known as the Pottsville Academy.

Pitman was elected as a Whig to the Thirty-first Congress. He later became affiliated with the Republican Party. He was engaged extensively in the lumber business. He was elected sheriff of Schuylkill County, Pennsylvania, in 1870 and served until his death in Pottsville in 1871. Interment in Presbyterian Cemetery.

== Sources ==
- United States Congress. "Charles W. Pitman (id: P000369)". Biographical Directory of the United States Congress.
- The Political Graveyard

U.S. House of Representatives
Preceded by George N. Eckert	Member of the U.S. House of Representatives from Pennsylvania's 14th congressional district 1849–1851	Succeeded by Thomas M. Bibighaus
