= Thomas Marshal Bibighaus =

American politician (1817–1853)

Member of the U.S. House of Representatives from Pennsylvania's 14th district
- In office March 4, 1851 – March 3, 1853
- Preceded by: Charles W. Pitman
- Succeeded by: Galusha A. Grow

Personal details
- Born: March 17, 1817 Philadelphia, Pennsylvania, U.S.
- Died: June 18, 1853 (aged 36) Lebanon, Pennsylvania, U.S.
- Resting place: Mount Lebanon Cemetery, Lebanon, Pennsylvania, U.S.
- Party: Whig
- Spouse: Caroline E. Weistling
- Children: 7
- Parent(s): Henry Bibighaus; Maria Sarah Zumstein
- Profession: Politician, lawyer

Thomas Marshal Bibighaus (March 17, 1817 – June 18, 1853) was an American politician and lawyer who served a single term in the United States House of Representatives, representing the 14th congressional district of Pennsylvania from 1851 to 1853 as a member of the Whig Party.

== Early life and education ==
Bibighaus was born in Philadelphia, Pennsylvania, on March 17, 1817, to Henry Bibighaus and Maria Sarah Zumstein. He studied law.

== Career ==
Bibighaus was admitted to the bar in 1839; he commenced practice in Lebanon, Pennsylvania.

Bibighaus served a single term in the United States House of Representatives, representing the 14th congressional district of Pennsylvania from 1851 to 1853 as a member of the Whig Party.

Bibighaus's time in office began on March 4, 1851, and concluded on March 3, 1853. He served in the 32nd United States Congress.

Bibighaus was not a candidate for renomination in 1852 to the 33rd United States Congress due to ill health. Following his tenure in Congress, Bibighaus resumed practicing law in Lebanon, Pennsylvania until his death in 1853.

== Personal life and death ==
Bibighaus was married to Caroline E. Weistling, with whom he had seven children.

Bibighaus died at the age of 36 in Lebanon, Pennsylvania, on June 18, 1853. He was interred in Mount Lebanon Cemetery, located in Lebanon.

== See also ==
- List of United States representatives who served a single term

U.S. House of Representatives
Preceded by Charles W. Pitman	Member of the U.S. House of Representatives from Pennsylvania's 14th congressional district 1851–1853	Succeeded by Galusha A. Grow
