= Thomas M. Pettit =

American politician

Thomas McKean Pettit

Director of the United States Mint
- In office April 1853 – May 1853
- Preceded by: George Nicholas Eckert
- Succeeded by: James Ross Snowden

Personal details
- Born: December 26, 1797 Philadelphia, Pennsylvania, US
- Died: May 30, 1853 (aged 55)
- Education: University of Pennsylvania

Thomas McKean Pettit (December 26, 1797 – May 30, 1853) was an American lawyer, politician, and judge who was briefly Director of the United States Mint in 1853 before his death in office.

== Biography ==
Thomas M. Pettit was born in Philadelphia on December 26, 1797, the son of merchant Andrew Pettit (son of Charles Pettit) and his wife Elizabeth (McKean) Pettit (daughter of Thomas McKean). Pettit entered the College of the University of Pennsylvania in 1812. On October 2, 1813, he was one of thirteen founding members of the Philomathean Society. He received an A.B. in 1815 and an A.M. in 1818.

After graduating from college, Pettit became a lawyer. By 1820, he was City Solicitor of Philadelphia. From 1824 to 1828, he was Deputy Attorney General to the Supreme and Oyer and Terminer Courts of Philadelphia. He was elected as a member of the Pennsylvania General Assembly in 1830; in 1831, he also served as a member of the Philadelphia City Council.

In 1832, Pettit became an Associate Judge of the District Court of Philadelphia. From 1835 to 1845, he was the district's presiding judge. He resigned from the bench in 1845 when he was appointed United States Attorney for the Eastern District of Pennsylvania. President of the United States Martin Van Buren later appointed him to the Board of Visitors of the United States Military Academy. In 1853, President Franklin Pierce appointed Pettit Director of the United States Mint. Pettit, however, died after only a few weeks in office.

Government offices
Preceded by George Nicholas Eckert	Director of the United States Mint; April 1853 – May 1853	Succeeded by James Ross Snowden
