= Henrietta H. Fore =

American government official

Henrietta Fore
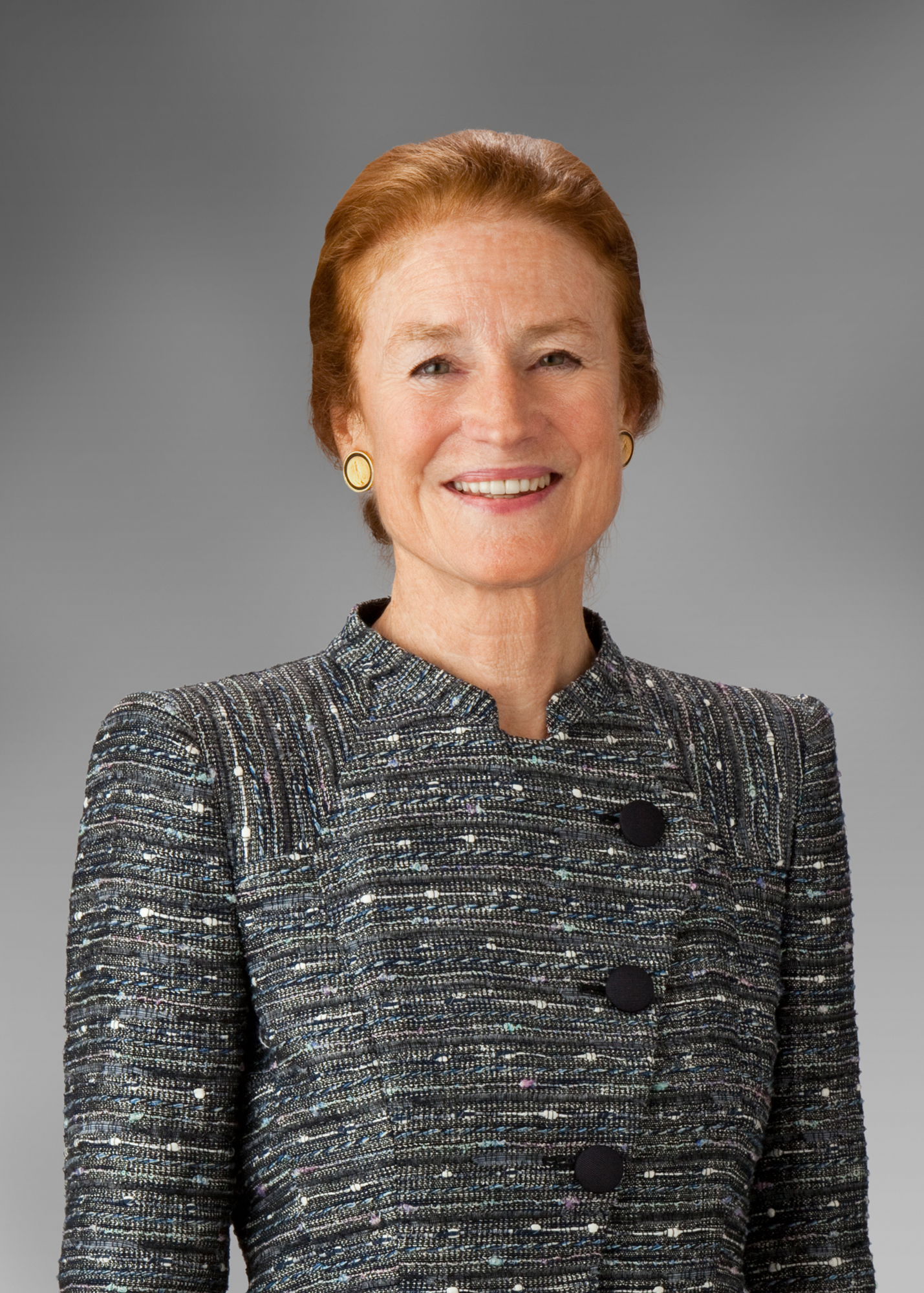
- Fore in 2011

Executive Director of UNICEF
- In office January 1, 2018 – January 31, 2022
- Secretary General: António Guterres
- Preceded by: Tony Lake
- Succeeded by: Catherine M. Russell

15th Administrator of the United States Agency for International Development
- In office November 17, 2007 – January 20, 2009
- President: George W. Bush
- Preceded by: Randall Tobias
- Succeeded by: Alonzo Fulgham (acting)

13th Under Secretary of State for Management
- In office August 2, 2005 – November 17, 2007
- President: George W. Bush
- Preceded by: Grant Green
- Succeeded by: Patrick Kennedy

37th Director of the United States Mint
- In office August 7, 2001 – August 2, 2005
- President: George W. Bush
- Preceded by: Jay Johnson
- Succeeded by: Edmund Moy

Personal details
- Born: Henrietta Holsman; December 9, 1948 (age 77) Chicago, Illinois, U.S.
- Party: Republican
- Spouse: Richard Fore
- Children: 4
- Relatives: Henry K. Holsman (grandfather)
- Education: Wellesley College (BA); University of Northern Colorado (MPP)

Henrietta Holsman Fore (born December 9, 1948) is an American government official and business executive who was the executive director of UNICEF from 2018 until 2022. Fore is chairman and CEO of Holsman International, a management, investment, and advisory services company. She served in three presidential appointments under President George W. Bush: Fore was the first woman Administrator of the United States Agency for International Development (USAID) and Director of U.S. Foreign Assistance, the 11th Under Secretary of Management in the Department of State, and the 37th Director of the United States Mint in the U.S. Department of Treasury. She was the presidential appointee for President George H. W. Bush at the United States Agency for International Development.

== Early life and education ==
Fore was born in Chicago, Illinois. Her mother was from Switzerland. Her father served the military during World War I. Her grandfather is turn of the century architect Henry K. Holsman, inventor of the Holsman Automobile (1902-1911).

Fore grew up in Santa Barbara, California and attended Crane Country Day School and Cold Springs School. She attended the Graham-Eckes School in Palm Beach, Florida, and graduated in 1966 from The Baldwin School, a private girls boarding school in Bryn Mawr, Pennsylvania.

In 1970, Fore received a B.A. in history, economics, and art from Wellesley College. In 1975, she received a M.S. in public administration from the University of Northern Colorado. In 1986, she studied international politics at the University of Oxford.

== Career ==
After college, Fore worked in the federal government. She then worked at one of her father's companies, a small manufacturing business in the steel industry, a position she held for 12 years. From 1977 to 1989, she was president and director of Stockton Wire Products in Burbank, California. From 1981 to 1989, she was president and the chairman of the board of Pozacorp, Inc. in Burbank, California.

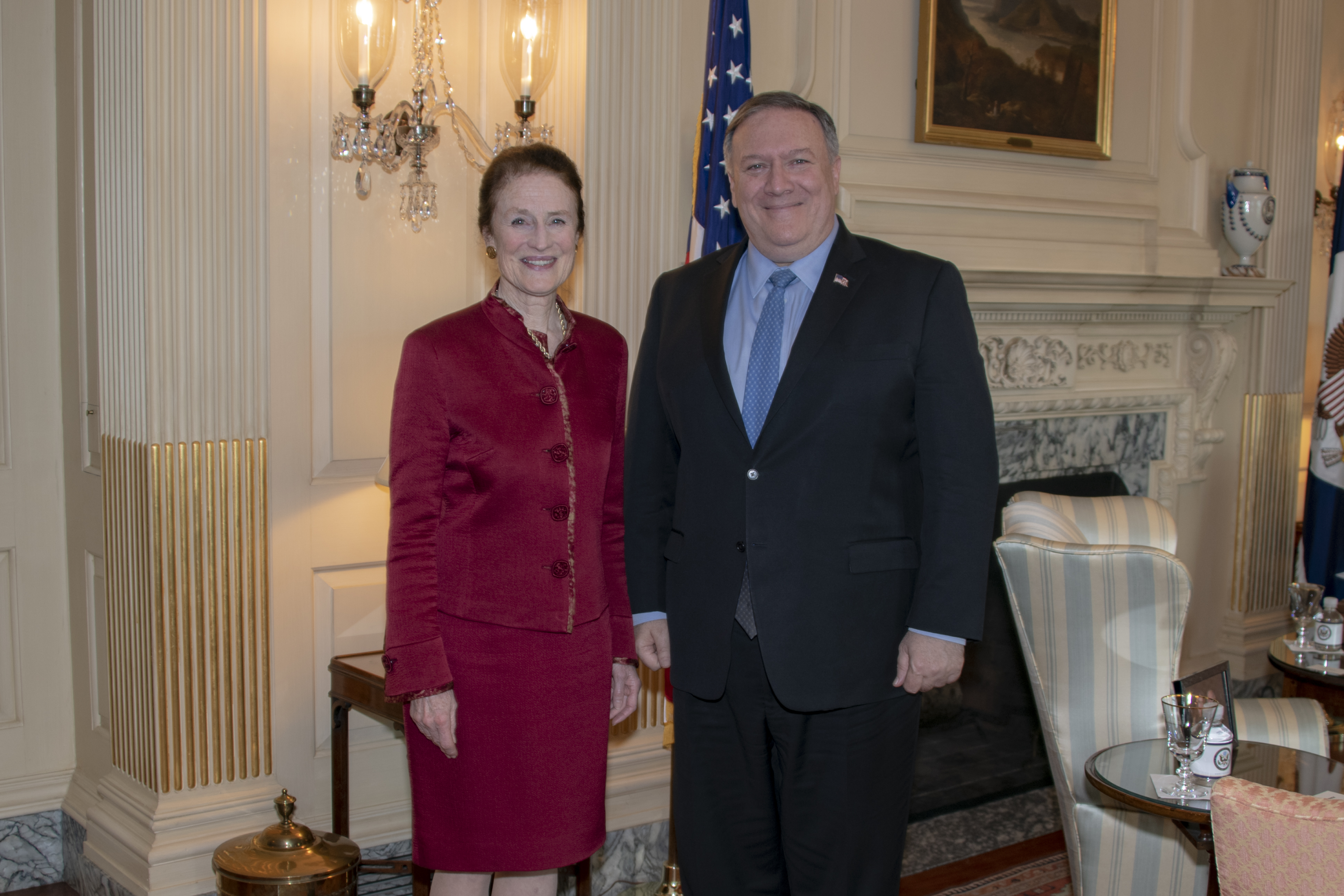
Fore meets with U.S. Secretary of State Michael R. Pompeo at the U.S. Department of State in Washington, D.C., on April 10, 2019.

From 2001 to 2005, Fore served as the 37th Director of the United States Mint in the U.S. Department of Treasury, serving Secretary of Treasury, Paul H. O'Neill and Secretary of Treasury John W. Snow.

From 2005 to 2007, Fore served as Under Secretary of State for Management, the Chief Operating Officer for the United States Department of State, serving Secretary of State, Condoleezza Rice.

From May 2007 to January 2009, Fore served as the 13th Administrator of the U.S. Agency for International Development (USAID), and Director of United States Foreign Assistance, holding the equivalent rank as Deputy Secretary of State.

In January 2018, Fore was appointed as the executive director of UNICEF by the Secretary-General of the United Nations, Antonio Guterres. As part of this position, Fore has worked in collaboration with GAVI, Coalition for Epidemic Preparedness Innovations (CEPI), and the World Health Organization, among others, to facilitate vaccination to combat the COVID-19 global pandemic.

Fore resigned in July 2021 to attend to her husband’s serious health issue but offered to stay on until her successor was recruited. Her successor, Catherine M. Russell, assumed office on February 1, 2022.

Fore is the Chairman and CEO of Holsman International; Chairman and Owner of Stockton Products and Vincenza; and Chairman and Managing Partner of Seaward International Company. She is a Mission Board Member of EQT Future Fund; Director of Imperative Care; Board Trustee of Center for Strategic and International Studies (CSIS); and a Board Member of Global Preparedness Monitoring Board, co-convened by the World Bank Group and WHO.

== Personal life ==
Fore lives in Nevada with her husband Richard L. Fore, who has four children. She has one sister, Marta Babson. Fore is a Republican.

== Selected honors ==
- 2022: Emperor of Japan, Imperial Palace Grand Cordon of the Order of the Rising Sun
- 2022: American Committees on Foreign Relations Distinguished Service Award for the Advancement of Public Discourse on Foreign Policy
- 2020: U.S. Global Leadership Coalition Leadership Award
- 2013: CRDF Global’s George Brown Award for International Scientific Cooperation
- 2009: United States Secretary of State, Distinguished Service Award
- 2005: U.S. Department of the Treasury, Alexander Hamilton Award
- 1997: State of the World Forum, Women Redefining Leadership Award

== Selected leadership and memberships ==
- 2022–present: GWL Voices for Change and Inclusion (New York)
- 2022–present: EQT Future Fund, Mission Board Member
- 2022–present: Imperative Care, Director
- 2022–present, 2009-2017: Seaward International Company, Chairman and CEO
- 2022–present, 1995-2017: Center for Strategic and International Studies (CSIS), Board Trustee
- 2022–present, 1993-2017: Holsman International, Chairman and CEO
- 2022–present, 1977-2017: Stockton Products, President and Director
- 2020–present: Global Preparedness Monitoring Board, co-convened by the World Bank and WHO
- 2018-2022: UNICEF, Executive Director
- 2018-2022: Chief Executives Board of the United Nations, Secretariat for the U.N. Secretary-General NY
- 2018-2022: Global Leadership Council Generation Unlimited, Co-Chair
- 2018-2021: End Violence Against Children, Chair
- 2016-2017: Essilor International S.A., Executive Officers & Remuneration Committee and Strategic Committee
- 2015-2017: Middle East Investment Initiative, Chair of the Board of Directors
- 2014-2017: Initiative for Global Development, Director, Chair
- 2014-2017: General Mills, Governance Committee and Public Responsibility Committee
- 2012-2017: ExxonMobil, Audit Committee and Finance Committee
- 2011-2017: Center for Global Development, Director
- 2010-2017: Committee for Economic Development, Trustee
- 2010-2017: Theravance Biopharma US, Inc., Chair, Nominating and Governance Committee
- 2009-2015: WomenCorporateDirectors Foundation (New York), Global Co-chair
- 2007-2009: Millennium Challenge Corporation, Board Member
- 2007-2009: Overseas Private Investment Corporation, Board Member
- 1993-2017: Asia Society, Co-chair, Global Board of Directors
- 1993-2017: The Aspen Institute, Board Trustee
- 1993-2017: Chief Executives for Corporate Purpose (CECP), Board Member
- 1987-1989: Water Quality Management, Board Member
- 1987: Stanford Graduate School of Business, Board Governance
- 1981-1989: Pozacorp, Inc., Chairman of the Board
- American Academy of Diplomacy, Member
- American Leadership for a WaterSecure World Campaign Cabinet, Member
- Chief Executives Organization, Member
- Committee of 200, Member
- Council on Foreign Relations, Member
- Economic Club of New York, Member
- International Women's Forum, Member
- Wellesley College Business Leadership Council, Member
- YPO/WPO, Member

== Selected works and publications ==
- Ghebreyesus, Tedros Adhanom; Fore, Henrietta; Birtanov, Yelzhan; Jakab, Zsuzsanna (October 2018). "Primary health care for the 21st century, universal health coverage, and the Sustainable Development Goals". The Lancet. 392 (10156): 1371–1372. doi:10.1016/S0140-6736(18)32556-X. PMID 30343843. Wikidata ()
- Berkley, Seth; Fore, Henrietta (26 April 2019). "Health for all". Science. 364 (6438): 309. Bibcode:2019Sci...364..309B. doi:10.1126/SCIENCE.AAX7591. PMID 31023899. Wikidata ()
- Fore, Henrietta H (July 2020). "A wake-up call: COVID-19 and its impact on children's health and wellbeing". The Lancet Global Health. 8 (7): e861–e862. doi:10.1016/S2214-109X(20)30238-2. PMC 7217644. PMID 2405458. Wikidata ()
- Fore, Henrietta H; Dongyu, Qu; Beasley, David M; Ghebreyesus, Tedros A (August 2020). "Child malnutrition and COVID-19: the time to act is now". The Lancet. 396 (10250): 517–518. doi:10.1016/S0140-6736(20)31648-2. PMC 7384790. PMID 32730742. Wikidata ()

Government offices
Preceded by Jay Johnson	Director of the United States Mint; 2001–2005	Succeeded by Edmund Moy
Political offices
Preceded by Grant Green	Under Secretary of State for Management; 2005–2007	Succeeded by Patrick Kennedy
Preceded by Randall Tobias	Administrator of the United States Agency for International Development; 2007–2009	Succeeded by Alonzo Fulgham; Acting
Diplomatic posts
Preceded by Tony Lake	Executive Director of UNICEF; 2018–2022	Succeeded by Catherine M. Russell
