= Robert Maskell Patterson =

American physician, professor and 6th director of the U.S. Mint (1787–1854)

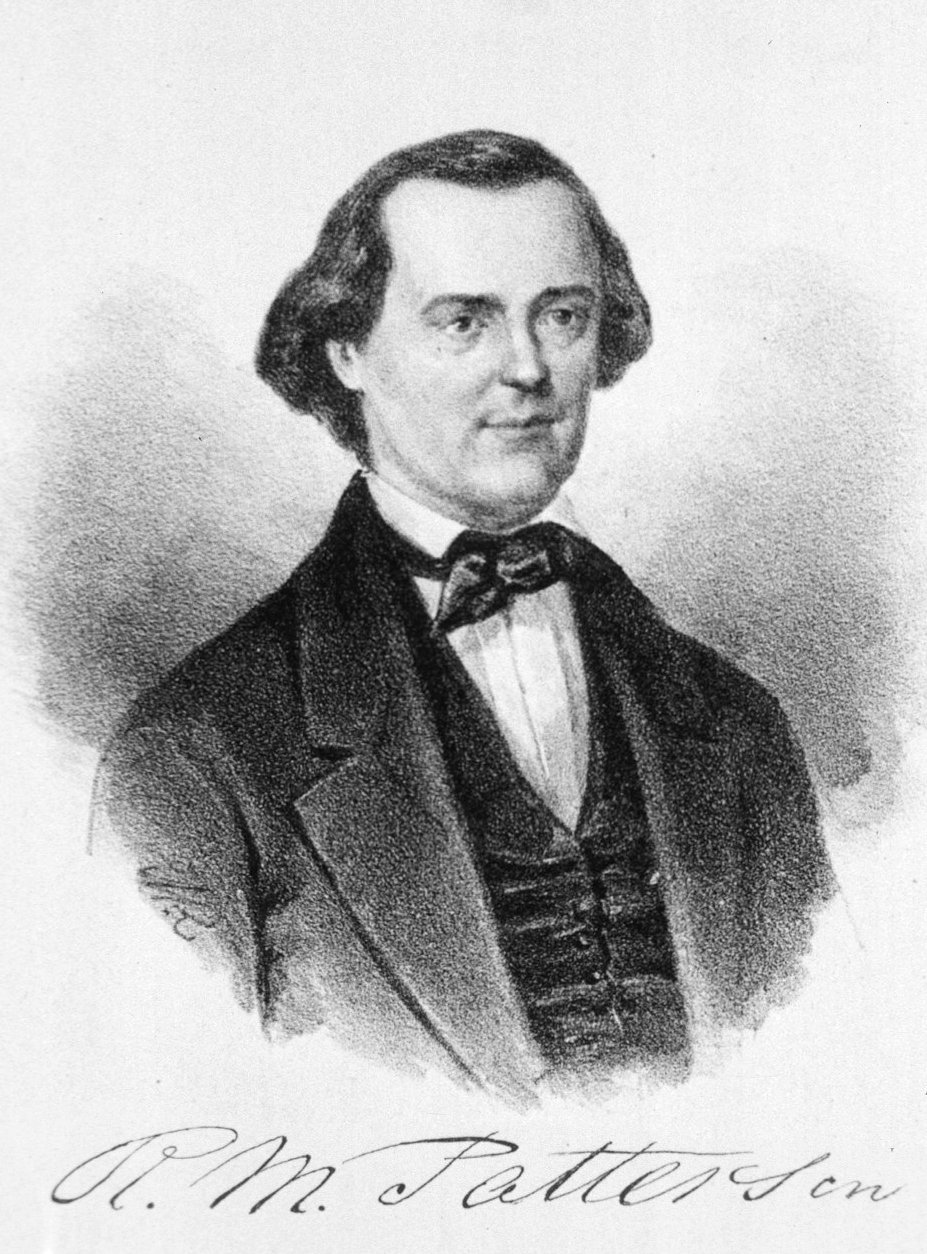

6th Director of the United States Mint
- In office 1835–1851
- President: Millard Fillmore
- Preceded by: Samuel Moore
- Succeeded by: George Nicholas Eckert

Personal details
- Born: March 23, 1787 Philadelphia, Pennsylvania, US
- Died: September 5, 1854 (aged 67) Philadelphia, Pennsylvania, US
- Resting place: Laurel Hill Cemetery, Philadelphia, Pennsylvania, U.S.
- Spouse: Helen Hamilton Leiper
- Relations: Robert Patterson (father)

Robert Maskell Patterson (March 23, 1787 – September 5, 1854) was an American professor of mathematics, chemistry and natural philosophy at the University of Pennsylvania from 1812 to 1828 and professor of natural philosophy at the University of Virginia from 1828 to 1835. He served as the 6th director of the United States Mint from 1835 to 1851 and as president of the American Philosophical Society from 1809 to 1854.

== Early life and education ==
Patterson was born on March 23, 1787, in Philadelphia, one of eight children of Robert Patterson and Amy Hunter Ewing. Patterson attended the University of Pennsylvania and graduated in 1804 with a B.A.. He studied medicine under Benjamin Smith Barton and graduated with a M.D. in 1808. He continued his education in Paris, France at the Jardins des plantes, and studied with René Just Haüy, Louis Nicolas Vauquelin, Adrien-Marie Legendre and Siméon Denis Poisson. In 1811, Patterson travelled to England and studied with Humphry Davy.

== Career ==
He returned to the United States in 1812 and was appointed professor of natural philosophy, chemistry and mathematics in the department of medicine at the University of Pennsylvania. He was appointed vice provost in 1814. Patterson remained at Penn until 1828 when he joined the faculty of the University of Virginia. He was chairman of the university's faculty from 1830 until 1832. He was elected an Associate Fellow of the American Academy of Arts and Sciences in 1834. Patterson was nominated as director of the U.S. Mint by President Andrew Jackson and served from 1835 to 1851. In 1807, Patterson and his father were consulted by Ferdinand Rudolph Hassler for guidance on the United States Coast and Geodetic Survey. In 1826, Patterson was Consulted by the governor of Pennsylvania to determine the best source of water for a state canal.

He was active in the Franklin Institute, the Musical Fund Society of Philadelphia and the Pennsylvania Institution for the Instruction of the Blind.

Patterson died on September 5, 1854, in Philadelphia, and was interred at Laurel Hill Cemetery. He was married to Helen Hamilton Leiper, daughter of Thomas Leiper, on April 20, 1814, and together they had six children.

== American Philosophical Society ==
Patterson was the youngest person elected to the American Philosophical Society at the age of 22 in 1809. He served as secretary in 1813, as vice-president in 1825, and as president in 1849.

Government offices
Preceded by Samuel Moore	6th Director of the United States Mint; 1835–1851	Succeeded by George Nicholas Eckert
