= Robert Patterson (educator) =

Mathematician and director of the United States Mint (1743-1824)

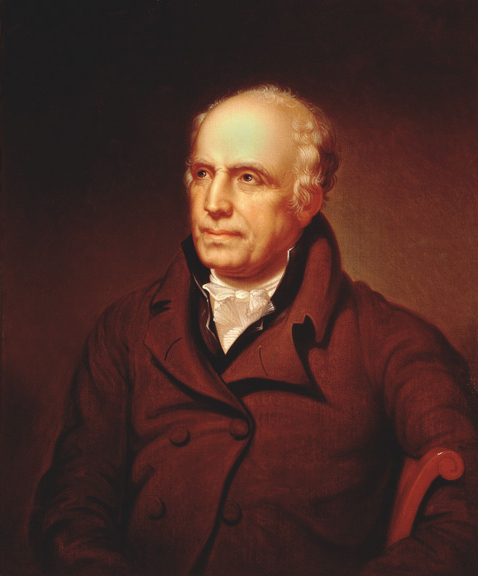
- 1830 painting of Patterson by Rembrandt Peale, a copy of his own earlier work from 1812

4th Director of the United States Mint
- In office January 1806 – July 1824
- President: Thomas Jefferson; James Madison; James Monroe
- Preceded by: Elias Boudinot
- Succeeded by: Samuel Moore

Personal details
- Born: 30 May 1743 near Royal Hillsborough, Ireland
- Died: 22 July 1824 (aged 81)
- Resting place: Laurel Hill Cemetery, Philadelphia, Pennsylvania, U.S.
- Relatives: Robert Maskell Patterson (son)
- Profession: Educator

Robert Patterson (30 May 1743 – 22 July 1824) was an Irish-American mathematician and director of the United States Mint from 1806 to 1824. He was a professor of mathematics at the University of Pennsylvania from 1779 to 1810, professor of natural history and mathematics and vice provost from 1810 to 1813. At the request of Thomas Jefferson, he advised Meriwether Lewis on the purchase and usage of navigational equipment for the Lewis and Clark Expedition.

== Early life and education ==
He was born on 30 May 1743, on a farm near Hillsborough, County Down, Ireland, to Robert Patterson and Jane Walkers. He attended school at an early age and excelled in mathematics, however his family could not afford to send him to college. He enrolled in the militia and was promoted to sergeant. He was offered a commission to the regular army, but declined and returned to work on the family farm. He emigrated to the Province of Pennsylvania in 1768.

He received an honorary Master of Arts in 1788 and a LL.D. degree in 1819 from the University of Pennsylvania.

== Career ==
He taught at schools in Hinkletown and Northampton, Pennsylvania. He moved to Philadelphia and opened a school to teach navigational mathematics to ship captains. One of his students was Andrew Ellicott who became a notable surveyor. He operated a country store in Bridgeton, New Jersey for two years.

In 1774, he became principal of Wilmington Academy in Wilmington, Delaware. Classes were suspended at the outbreak of the American Revolutionary War and he served in the war for about three years as a military instructor, an assistant surgeon, adjutant to the 1st Delaware Regiment under John Haslet, and as a brigade major.

He worked as a professor of mathematics at the University of Pennsylvania from 1799 to 1810 as well as professor of natural history and mathematics and vice provost from 1810 to 1813. He was elected president of Philadelphia's Select Council in 1799.

He was elected a member of the American Philosophical Society in 1783, served as secretary in 1784, vice-president in 1799 and president from 1819 to 1823. He published The Newtonian System (1808) and edited various works on mathematics and physics.

In 1803, Thomas Jefferson wrote a letter to Patterson requesting that he meet with Meriwether Lewis and provide further instruction and advice on calculating latitude and longitude during the Lewis and Clark Expedition. Patterson was one of five American Philosophical Society members who were consulted by Lewis prior to the expedition. In anticipation of the visit from Lewis, Patterson began to calculate astronomical formulas for usage on the expedition for the calculation of longitude from lunar observations and for altitude and time.

Patterson advised Lewis on the navigational equipment to purchase for the expedition and trained him on their usage. Jefferson recommended that Lewis use a theodolite for the calculation of latitude and longitude, however Patterson recommended usage of a sextant instead since it would handle better under the rigors of field work. Patterson advised Lewis on the purchase of a chronometer necessary for calculation of latitude and longitude as well as other techniques in case the chronometer malfunctioned. The chronometer was purchased in Philadelphia for $250, the most expensive single item purchased for the expedition.

Patterson was interested in ciphers and regularly exchanged coded correspondence with Thomas Jefferson. One of Patterson's ciphers included in a 19 December 1801, dated letter to Jefferson was decoded in 2007 by Lawren Smithline. The cipher consists of 7 digit pairs and is decoded by decrypting 7 blocks at a time. The cipher was of the Declaration of Independence, of which Jefferson was the primary author. Patterson called it his "perfect cipher" and Jefferson considered adopting it for government use.

Jefferson appointed Patterson as director of the United States Mint in 1805 and he served in this role until his death. Patterson was one of the founders of the Franklin Institute in Philadelphia and served as the first chairman of their board of managers.

He died on 22 July 1824, and was initially interred in a churchyard in Philadelphia and reinterred in 1844 at Laurel Hill Cemetery along with his wife after her death.

== Personal life ==
He married Amy H. Ewing on 9 May 1774, and together they had eight children, six who lived to an adult age. Their son, Robert M. Patterson, also served as director of the mint and succeeded his father as professor of mathematics at the University of Pennsylvania.

== Published works ==
- The Newtonian System of Philosophy, Philadelphia: Johnson & Warner, 1808
- Astronomy Explain Upon Sir Isaac Newton's Principles and Made Easy to Those Who Have Not Studied Mathematics., Philadelphia: Matthew Carey, 1809
- A Treatise of Practical Arithmetic, Intended for the Use of Schools; in Two Parts., Pittsburgh: R. Patterson and Lambdin, 1819

Government offices
Preceded by Elias Boudinot	4th Director of the United States Mint; 1806–1824	Succeeded by Samuel Moore
