= Gertrude Polcar =

American politician

Member of the Ohio House of Representatives from the 51st district
- In office January 3, 1969-December 31, 1971
- Preceded by: Ron Mottl
- Succeeded by: Donna Pope

Personal details
- Born: October 10, 1916
- Died: September 23, 1988 (aged 71) Cleveland, Ohio, US
- Party: Republican

Gertrude E. Polcar (October 10, 1916 – September 23, 1988) was a former member of the Ohio House of Representatives. Polcar received her J.D. degree from the University of Chicago Law School. After serving in the Ohio House of Representatives, she was elected to the Parma Municipal Court and served there until she became ill with cancer and resigned her seat a few months before her death.
