= Edmund C. Moy =

Former director of US Mint, businessman

- Chinese: 梅冠芳
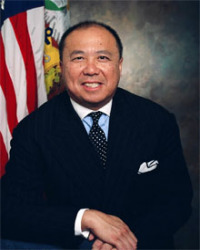

38th Director of the United States Mint
- In office September 5, 2006 – January 9, 2011
- President: George W. Bush; Barack Obama
- Preceded by: Henrietta H. Fore
- Succeeded by: Richard A. Peterson (acting)

Personal details
- Born: September 12, 1957 (age 69) Detroit, Michigan, U.S.
- Spouse: Karen Johnson Moy
- Children: 1

Edmund C. Moy (born September 12, 1957) is an American businessman and former government official. From 2006 to 2011, he served as the 38th director of the United States Mint.

== Early life and education ==
Born in Detroit, Michigan on September 12, 1957, Moy was raised in Waukesha, Wisconsin, where he worked in his parents' restaurant while growing up. He is a 1975 graduate of Waukesha North High School and a 1979 graduate of the University of Wisconsin–Madison, where he graduated with a triple major in economics, international relations, and political science. At UW–Madison, Moy is a member of the Tau Kappa Epsilon International Fraternity.

== Personal life ==
Moy is an active participant in organizations representing the Asian-American community, as well as a member of the Board of Directors of Christianity Today International. He was elected as the Grand Crysophylos (Treasurer) for Tau Kappa Epsilon International Fraternity at the 54th Biennial Conclave held in Las Vegas, Nevada on August 7, 2007. He then became Grand Grammateus (Secretary), followed by Grand Epiprytanis (Vice President). He was named the Teke Alumnus of the Year in 2005. He was elected Grand Prytanis (President) at the 2011 Conclave.

For two-and-one-half years, beginning in 1997, Moy suffered from a debilitating nerve illness, which was later cured by brain surgery.

Moy is married to Karen Johnson Moy, and has a daughter that was adopted from China, named Nora Sue Moy (born in 2005).

== Career ==
From 1979 to 1989, Moy worked for Blue Cross Blue Shield United of Wisconsin. Moy then served as Director of the Office of Managed Care at the Health Care Financing Administration during the George H. W. Bush administration. From 1994 to 2001, he worked for a number of private-sector companies. From 2001 to 2006, Moy served in the George W. Bush administration as Special Assistant to the President for Presidential Personnel. He oversaw the selection of candidates for presidential appointments in the general areas of human, natural, and cultural resources. In 2003, he served on the transition team for the newly created Department of Homeland Security.

On June 29, 2006, President Bush nominated Moy to serve as the 38th director of the United States Mint. He was sworn in on September 5, 2006. Moy earned the Alexander Hamilton Medal for public service, awarded by then-Treasury Secretary Henry M. Paulson, Jr. Moy announced his resignation as Director of the United States Mint on December 20, 2010, effective January 9, 2011. After leaving the United States Mint, Moy became Vice President Corporate Infrastructure for L&L Energy, Inc. As of 2014, he is the chief strategist for Fortress Gold Group. Moy also writes occasional articles for Moneynews.com. In November 2021, Moy joined the thought leadership team at U.S. Money Reserve as Senior IRA Strategist.

In 2021, Moy was named one of Coin World's Most Influential People in Numismatics (1960-2020).

Government offices
Preceded by Henrietta H. Fore	38th Director of the United States Mint; 2006–2011	Succeeded by David J. Ryder
