= George Nicholas Eckert =

American politician

George N. Eckert
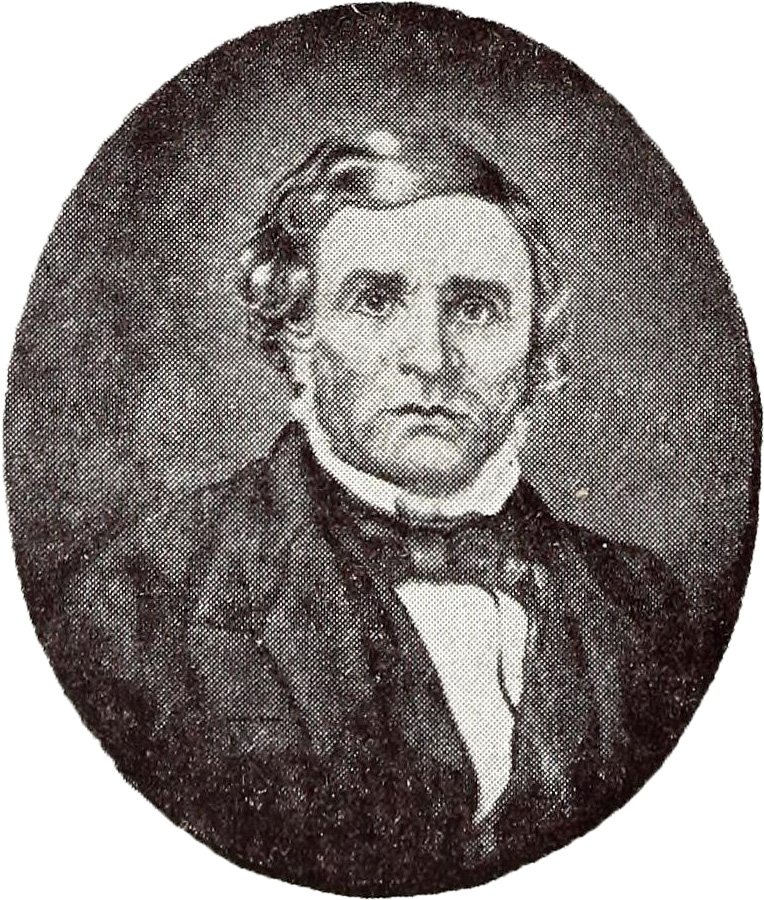

7th Director of the United States Mint
- In office 1851–1853
- President: Millard Fillmore; Franklin Pierce
- Preceded by: Robert M. Patterson
- Succeeded by: Thomas M. Pettit

Member of the U.S. House of Representatives from Pennsylvania's 14th district
- In office March 4, 1847 – March 3, 1849
- Preceded by: Alexander Ramsey
- Succeeded by: Charles Wesley Pitman

Personal details
- Born: July 4, 1802 Womelsdorf, Pennsylvania, US
- Died: June 28, 1865 (aged 62) Philadelphia, Pennsylvania, US
- Resting place: Laurel Hill Cemetery, Philadelphia, Pennsylvania, U.S.
- Party: Whig

George Nicholas Eckert (July 4, 1802 – June 28, 1865) was an American politician from Pennsylvania who served as a Whig member of the U.S. House of Representatives for Pennsylvania's 14th congressional district from 1847 to 1849. Eckert also served as the 7th Director of the United States Mint from 1851 to 1853.

== Early life and education ==
George N. Eckert was born in Womelsdorf, Pennsylvania. He graduated from the medical department of the University of Pennsylvania in Philadelphia in 1824 and commenced practice in Reading, Pennsylvania. He was one of the organizers of Berks County Medical Society in 1824. He moved to Pine Grove, Schuylkill County, Pennsylvania, and engaged in the coal and iron trade.

== Political career ==
Eckert was elected as a Whig to the Thirtieth Congress. He was appointed Director of the United States Mint at Philadelphia by President Millard Fillmore and served from June 1851 to June 6, 1853. He died in Philadelphia in 1865 and was interred in Laurel Hill Cemetery.

U.S. House of Representatives
Preceded by Alexander Ramsey	Member of the U.S. House of Representatives from Pennsylvania's 14th congressional district 1847–1849	Succeeded by Charles W. Pitman
Government offices
Preceded by Robert M. Patterson	7th Director of the United States Mint; 1851–1853	Succeeded by Thomas M. Pettit
