= Jay Johnson (politician) =

American politician and journalist (1943–2009)

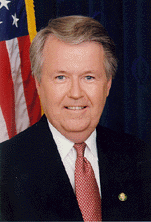

36th Director of the United States Mint
- In office May 2000 – August 2001
- President: Bill Clinton; George W. Bush
- Preceded by: Philip N. Diehl
- Succeeded by: Henrietta H. Fore

Member of the U.S. House of Representatives from Wisconsin's 8th district
- In office January 3, 1997 – January 3, 1999
- Preceded by: Toby Roth
- Succeeded by: Mark Green

Personal details
- Born: September 30, 1943 Bessemer, Michigan, U.S.
- Died: October 17, 2009 (aged 66) Bristow, Virginia, U.S.
- Resting place: Stonewall Memory Gardens; Manassas, Virginia
- Party: Democratic
- Education: Gogebic Community College (AA); Northern Michigan University (BA); Michigan State University (MA)

Military service
- Allegiance: United States
- Branch/service: United States Army
- Years of service: 1966–1968
- Unit: Brooke Army Medical Center

Jay Withington Johnson (September 30, 1943 – October 17, 2009) was an American politician and journalist who served as the 36th director of the United States Mint, and one-term member of the United States House of Representatives from Wisconsin. He was also a television news anchor in Green Bay, Wisconsin for WFRV-TV and WLUK-TV.

== Early life and education ==
Johnson was born in Bessemer, Michigan and graduated from Bessemer High School. He earned an associate degree in speech from Gogebic Community College in 1963 and a Bachelor of Arts degree in speech from Northern Michigan University in 1965. Johnson was an information specialist with the United States Army from 1966 until 1968. He was on the board of directors of the Wisconsin United Way. Johnson received a master's degree in radio and television arts from Michigan State University in 1970.

== Career ==
=== Journalism ===
Johnson was a broadcaster and journalist working in Michigan, Indiana, and Florida before settling Green Bay, Wisconsin, where he worked for 16 years at WFRV-TV and WLUK-TV.

=== Politics ===
In 1996, Johnson was elected to represent Wisconsin's 8th congressional district in the 105th United States Congress after 18-year incumbent Toby Roth chose not to run for a 10th term. He was the fourth Democrat to represent the district in the 20th century. He was defeated after one term by State Assemblyman Mark Green in 1998. In August 1999, Johnson was nominated by President Bill Clinton to become Director of the United States Mint. He was confirmed by the United States Senate in May 2000 and served until his successor was appointed by President George W. Bush in August 2001. After leaving the U.S. Mint, he was self-employed, selling wholesale coins and was the chief numismatist for The Franklin Mint.

On June 29, 2009, Goldline International, Inc., announced that Johnson had become a spokesperson for their company.

== Death ==
On October 17, 2009, Johnson died at his home in Bristow, Virginia, of an apparent heart attack. He was survived by his wife, JoLee, and his two stepchildren.

== Electoral history ==
Wisconsin's 8th Congressional District Election, 1996
Party	Candidate	Votes	%	±%
Democratic Primary Election, September 10, 1996
Democratic	Jay W. Johnson	18,293	59.06%	
Democratic	Stan Gruszynski	12,681	40.94%	
Total votes		30,974	100.0%	
General Election, November 5, 1996
Democratic	Jay W. Johnson	129,551	52.04%	+15.77%
Republican	David Prosser, Jr.	119,398	47.96%	
Plurality		10,153	4.08%	-23.38%
Total votes		248,949	100.0%	+38.78%
Democratic gain from Republican		Swing	31.54%	

Wisconsin's 8th Congressional District Election, 1998
Party	Candidate	Votes	%	±%
General Election, November 3, 1998
Republican	Mark Andrew Green	112,418	54.61%	
Democratic	Jay W. Johnson (incumbent)	93,441	45.39%	−6.65%
Plurality		18,977	9.22%	+5.14%
Total votes		205,859	100.0%	-17.31%
Republican gain from Democratic		Swing	13.30%	

U.S. House of Representatives
Preceded by Toby Roth	Member of the U.S. House of Representatives from Wisconsin's 8th congressional district 1997 – 1999	Succeeded by Mark A. Green
Government offices
Preceded by Philip N. Diehl	Director of the United States Mint; 2000 – 2001	Succeeded by Henrietta H. Fore
