= Donna Pope =

American politician (1931–2023)

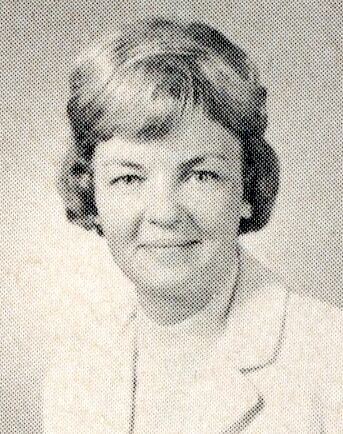

33rd Director of the United States Mint
- In office September 10, 1981 – August 1991
- President: Ronald Reagan; George H. W. Bush
- Preceded by: Stella Hackel Sims
- Succeeded by: David J. Ryder

Member of the Ohio House of Representatives
- In office January 2, 1973 – May 13, 1981
- Preceded by: Bill Mussey
- Succeeded by: Edna Deffler
- Constituency: 12th district
- In office January 5, 1972 – December 31, 1972
- Preceded by: Gertrude Polcar
- Succeeded by: Tom Gilmartin
- Constituency: 51st district

Personal details
- Born: October 15, 1931 Cleveland, Ohio, U.S.
- Died: June 23, 2023 (aged 91) Colorado, U.S.

Donna Pope (October 15, 1931 – June 23, 2023) was an American politician and civil servant who served as the Director of the United States Mint, appointed by President Ronald Reagan.

== Career ==
Pope served as a member of the Ohio House of Representatives from 1972 to 1981. After being chosen to serve as Director of the United States Mint, she resigned from the House on May 13, 1981 to work for the Mint as a consultant while she waited to be confirmed by the United States Senate. On September 10, 1981, she was officially sworn in as Director.

During her time as the Director of the United States Mint, she oversaw the establishment of gold coins, which were the first since 1933. After leaving the United States Mint in 1991, she served as the Director of U.S. Market Activities for the International Olympic Committee's centennial coin program.

== Death ==
Pope died on June 23, 2023, at the age of 91.

Government offices
Preceded by Stella Hackel Sims	Director of the United States Mint; July 1981 – August 1991	Succeeded by David J. Ryder
