= Robert J. Grant =

Director of the United States Mint (1862–1949)

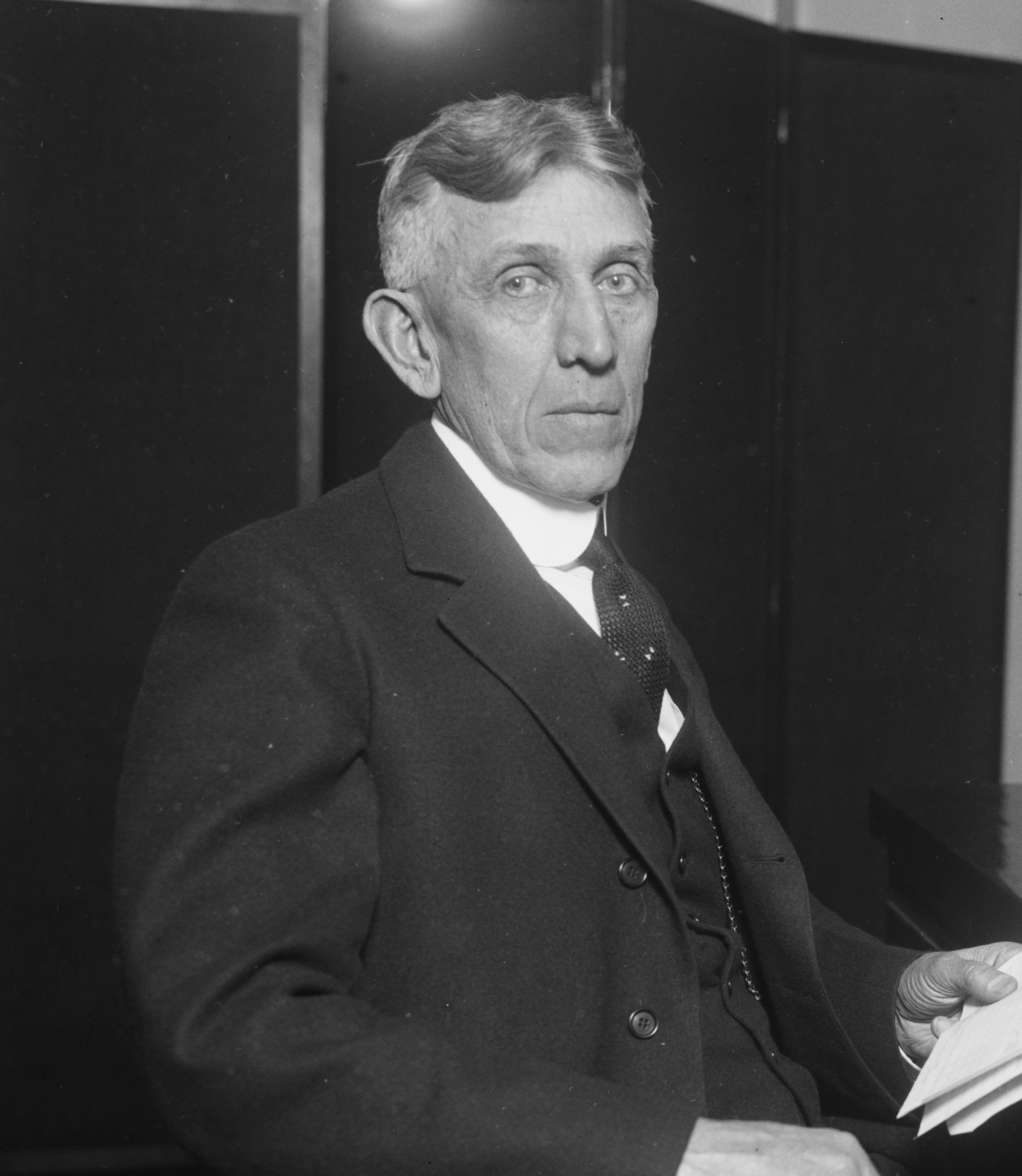
- Grant, photographed in 1923

27th Director of the United States Mint
- In office November 1923 – May 1933
- President: Calvin Coolidge; Herbert Hoover; Franklin D. Roosevelt
- Preceded by: Frank Edgar Scobey
- Succeeded by: Nellie Tayloe Ross

Robert John Grant (November 12, 1862 – November 24, 1949) was an American government official who was Director of the United States Mint from 1923 to 1933.

Grant was born in Nova Scotia. Before becoming Director of the U.S. Mint, Grant was the Superintendent of the Denver Mint. In 1923, President Calvin Coolidge nominated Grant to be Director of the United States Mint and Grant subsequently held this office from November 1923 to May 1933. Upon leaving the U.S. Mint, Grant sailed to Shanghai to become mint adviser to the Chinese Nationalist government.

Government offices
| Preceded by Frank Edgar Scobey | Director of the United States Mint; November 1923 – May 1933 | Succeeded by Nellie Tayloe Ross |
