= Director of the United States Mint =

Head of the United States Mint

Director of United States Mint
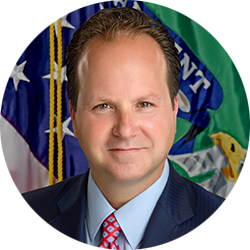
- Incumbent; Paul Hollis since January 5, 2026
- Appointer: President of the United States
- Term length: 5 years
- Formation: April 1792
- First holder: David Rittenhouse

Seal of the United States Mint.

The director of the United States Mint is the chief officer of the United States Mint. It is a presidential appointment that requires a Senate confirmation. The incumbent is Paul Hollis, who was confirmed by the Senate on December 18, 2025.

When the position of the director is vacant, the senior career (non-political) official of the mint serves as the acting director. Until the appointment of Ryder as director, the Mint had been without an official director since the resignation of Edmund C. Moy in 2011. Richard A. Peterson succeeded Moy. Peterson served between January 2011 and March 2017. The longest serving director was Nellie Ross. Ross, who had earlier been the first female governor in American history while serving the state of Wyoming, was director from 1933 until 1953.

In July 2015, Matthew Rhett Jeppson was nominated by President Barack Obama to become the Mint's 39th director and was given the temporary title of principal deputy director. However, the nomination was never confirmed by the Senate. Jeppson stepped down as principal deputy director in January 2017, then replaced by acting principal deputy director David Motl.

The office of director has existed since the creation of the Mint by the Coinage Act of 1792. Initially appointed serving at the pleasure of the president of the United States, the Coinage Act of 1873 specified a five-year term for directors. The director operates with general directions provided by the United States Secretary of the Treasury.

== List of directors of the United States Mint ==
The following persons served as director of the United States Mint:

No.	Image	Name	Tenure		Refs.	Appointed by
No.	Image	Name	Assumed office	Left office	Refs.	Appointed by
1		David Rittenhouse	April 1792	June 1795		Washington
2		Henry William de Saussure	July 1795	October 1795		Washington
3		Elias Boudinot	October 1795	July 1805		Washington
4		Robert Patterson	January 1806	July 1824		Jefferson
5		Samuel Moore	July 1824	July 1835		Monroe
6		Robert Maskell Patterson	May 1835	July 1851		Jackson
7		George Nicholas Eckert	July 1851	April 1853		Fillmore
8		Thomas M. Pettit	April 1853	May 1853		Pierce
9		James Ross Snowden	June 1853	May 1861		Pierce
10		James Pollock	May 1861	September 1866		Lincoln
11		William Millward	October 1866	April 1867		Johnson
12		Henry Linderman	April 1867	May 1869		Johnson
13		James Pollock	May 1869	March 1873		Grant
14		Henry Linderman	April 1873	December 1878		Grant
15		Horatio C. Burchard	February 1879	June 1885		Hayes
16		James P. Kimball	July 1885	October 1889		Cleveland
17		Edward O. Leech	October 1889	May 1893		Harrison
18		Robert E. Preston	November 1893	February 1898		Cleveland
19		George E. Roberts	February 1898	July 1907		McKinley
20		Frank A. Leach	September 1907	August 1909		Roosevelt, T.
21		A. Piatt Andrew	November 1909	June 1910		Taft
22		George E. Roberts	July 1910	November 1914		Taft
23		Robert W. Woolley	March 1915	July 1916		Wilson
24		Friedrich Johannes Hugo von Engelken	September 1916	March 1917		Wilson
25		Raymond T. Baker	March 1917	March 1922		Wilson
26		Frank Edgar Scobey	March 1922	September 1923		Harding
27		Robert J. Grant	November 1923	May 1933		Coolidge
28		Nellie Tayloe Ross	May 3, 1933	April 1953		Roosevelt, F.
29		William H. Brett	July 1954	January 1961		Eisenhower
30		Eva Adams	October 1961	August 1969		Kennedy
31		Mary Brooks	September 1969	February 1977		Nixon
32		Stella Hackel Sims	November 1, 1977	April 1, 1981		Carter
33		Donna Pope	September 10, 1981	August 1991		Reagan
34		David J. Ryder	September 1992	November 24, 1993		Bush, G. H. W.
35		Philip N. Diehl	June 1994	March 2000		Clinton
36		Jay W. Johnson	May 2000	August 2001		Clinton
37		Henrietta H. Fore	August 7, 2001	August 2, 2005		Bush, G. W.
38		Edmund C. Moy	September 5, 2006	January 9, 2011		Bush, G. W.
Acting		Richard A. Peterson	January 10, 2011	January 20, 2017		Obama
Acting		David Motl	January 20, 2017	January 31, 2018		
Acting		Dave Croft	February 1, 2018	April 11, 2018		
39		David J. Ryder	April 12, 2018	October 1, 2021		Trump
Acting		Alison Doone	October 1, 2021	October 25, 2021		
40		Ventris Gibson	June 22, 2022	March 31, 2025		Biden
Acting		Kristie McNally	March 31, 2025	January 5, 2026		Trump
41		Paul Hollis	January 5, 2026	Present		Trump

== See also ==
- United States Mint
- Treasurer of the United States
- Chief Engraver of the United States Mint
- Director of the Bureau of Engraving and Printing
- Master of the Mint
- Warden of the Mint
- Master of the Mint (Canada)
- Moneyers of the Roman Republic
