= Jay Gallé =

American politician

Member of the Louisiana House of Representatives from the 104th district
- Incumbent
- Assumed office January 8, 2024
- Preceded by: Paul Hollis

Personal details
- Born: Jack William Gallé Jr. New Orleans, Louisiana, U.S.
- Party: Republican
- Spouse: Diana Chauvin (m. 2014)
- Education: Louisiana State University; Troy State University; Loyola University New Orleans (BA); Mississippi State University
- Website: www.jaygalle.com

Jack "Jay" William Gallé Jr. is an American politician who serves as a member of the Louisiana House of Representatives from the 104th district. A member of the Republican Party and the Louisiana Freedom Caucus, he represents parts of St. Tammany Parish and has been in office since January 8, 2024.

== Biography ==
Jack William Gallé Jr. was born in 1963 or 1964 in New Orleans. He attended Holy Cross High School in the Lower Ninth Ward of New Orleans. He then attended Louisiana State University for one year, and later joined the United States Marine Corps where he was assigned as a reservist to Naval Air Station Joint Reserve Base New Orleans in Belle Chasse, Louisiana. He played football at Troy State University in 1987 but ended playing the sport after sustaining an injury. In 1993, Gallé received a Bachelor of Arts in communications from Loyola University New Orleans. Gallé worked as an actor and producer before he began working as a television meteorologist for KSBW. He completed a certificate of broadcast meteorology at Mississippi State University in 2009. He was a meteorologist and news anchor at WDSU.

Gallé married Diana Chauvin, the daughter of Pannee Varnishung who was the owner of La Thai Uptown, on October 4, 2014.

Gallé ran in the 2023 Louisiana House of Representatives election for the 104th district defeating John Raymond, a former headmaster of Lakeside Christian Academy who had been charged and since has been convicted of child cruelty, earning 64 percent of the vote.

Gallé is self employed and has been a member of several committees in the Louisiana House of Representatives, including the Joint Legislative Committee on Capital Outlay and the Special Committee on Military and Veterans Affairs. He is the chairman of the House Select Committee on Homeland Security.

In 2024, Gallé introduced a bill intended to limit the "liability of operators of motor vehicles for harm caused to certain persons who are injured while illegally blocking a road or highway" that was signed into law by Governor Jeff Landry.

In 2025, Gallé sponsored a bill authorizing police to neutralize suspicious drones that was signed into law by the governor.
