= Paul Hollis =

American politician (born 1972)

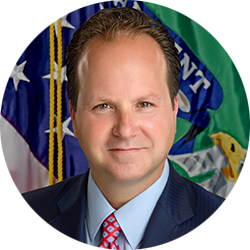

Director of the United States Mint
- Incumbent
- Assumed office January 5, 2026
- Deputy: Kristie McNally
- Preceded by: Ventris Gibson

Member of the Louisiana House of Representatives from the 104th district
- In office January 9, 2012 – January 8, 2024
- Preceded by: Nita Hutter
- Succeeded by: Jack Galle

Personal details
- Born: Paul Bryan Hollis; September 1, 1972 (age 54) Metairie, Louisiana, U.S.
- Party: Republican
- Spouse: Ashley Tastet
- Children: 2
- Education: Louisiana State University (BA)

Paul Bryan Hollis (born September 1, 1972) is an American politician and businessman serving as the director of the United States Mint. From 2012 to 2024, Hollis served as a Republican member of the Louisiana House of Representatives for the 104th district, which includes St. Tammany Parish in southeastern Louisiana.

A son of the late State Senator Ken Hollis, Paul Hollis defeated fellow Republican Christopher Trahan, 3,905 votes (56 percent) to 3,096 (44 percent) in the nonpartisan blanket primary held on October 22, 2011. Hollis was briefly a candidate for the 2014 United States Senate election in Louisiana, but withdrew from the race.

== Early life and education ==
Paul Hollis was born in Metairie in Jefferson Parish, the third son of Judy and Ken Hollis. He graduated in 1990 from Grace King High School in Metairie, at which he was the student body president.

Hollis held his first job, for a lawn care service, at the age of thirteen and worked through high school as a restaurant busboy. After studying martial arts for many years, he attained his black belt in karate and began teaching at Elmwood Fitness Center before his senior year.

At Louisiana State University in Baton Rouge, Hollis opened his first small business, a karate school. He received a degree in political science from LSU in 1994.

== Career ==
Hollis began collecting coins in 1978, at the age of six, when he received a Peace dollar from a grandmother. He still has the keepsake coin.

Hollis was employed by as the youngest salesperson at Blanchard and Company of New Orleans, one of the nation's largest rare coin and precious metal firms. He worked there until 2001.

In 2003, Hollis started his own firm, Paul Hollis Rare Coins, supplying collectible coins to television home shopping networks in Tennessee and Minnesota. Paul Hollis Rare Coins now specializes in ancient coins that circulated during the lifetime of Jesus Christ.

Hollis is one of the few numismatists to visit and undertake an in-depth of study of each of the United States Mints. He has achieved status of expert in treasure coins, often being interviewed by national and international media outlets.

In the winter of 2004, Hollis joined the Odyssey Marine Exploration to salvage coins from the SS Republic (1853).

In February 2009, Hollis began a giveaway of 1,000,000 Lincoln cents. This was to commemorate the centennial anniversary of the Lincoln cent, which began in 1909. He also gave 1,050 Adams dollars to students at the middle school he attended, John Quincy Adams Middle School.

In 2008, Hollis notably arranged for and escorted the 1844-O Proof $10 Eagle, worth $2.5 million, to be displayed at the Louisiana State Museum of the New Orleans Mint, a former branch facility of the U.S. Mint. This allowed twenty thousand persons to see the coin where it was minted.

=== Legislative career ===
Hollis was elected to the Louisiana House in November 2011. District 104 was newly redrawn as a result of the legislative redistricting plan, Act 1 of the 1st Extraordinary Session of 2011, signed into law by Governor Bobby Jindal on April 14, 2011. The district covers parts of the St. Tammany Parish communities of Mandeville, Abita Springs, Covington, Lacombe, Pearl River, and Slidell.

During his first year in office, Hollis was part of the Louisiana Bicentennial Task Force and assisted with an exhibit at the Old Louisiana State Capitol and the writing and production of the "History of Banking and Finance in Louisiana" in cooperation with the secretary of state's office.

Hollis served on the Commerce, Education, and Retirement committees.

In May 2017, Hollis obtained House passage, 70 to 27, of his bill to make it easier for voters to recall public officials. Currently, the threshold for obtaining signatures is too high for most recall petitions to bring forth an election, particularly in heavily populated areas. Recall organizers must define in the petition the reason for targeting an elected official. If approved by the Senate, the bill would require 20 percent of registered voters to sign a petition to set up a recall elections in jurisdictions of greater than 100,000 voters; for those between 25,000 and 100,000 25 percent is required. For areas under 1,000, the requirement is 40 percent. In communities of between 1,000 and 25,000 voters, one third must sign for the election to be held.

Hollis was succeeded by Jack Galle on January 8, 2024.

=== Writing career ===
Hollis is the author of the book American Numismatist, written for the American Numismatic Association. He traces U.S. history through the coins that were struck along the way. With many significant pictures and images of coins, the book is considered a resource to help beginners learn the trade.

=== Director of United States Mint ===
On July 17, 2025, President Donald Trump nominated Hollis to be the director of the United States Mint and on December 18, 2025, Hollis was confirmed by the United States Senate.

== Personal life ==
Paul met Ashley Tastet in 1996, and they married a few years later. In 2003, the couple had their daughter, Bree. In 2006, the Hollises settled near Mandeville in St. Tammany Parish. In 2013, Paul and Ashley had their second child, son Zachary.

== Awards ==
Hollis has received the:

- Business Champion Award from Southwest Louisiana Economic Development Alliance
- A 97 percent rating from the Louisiana Association of Business and Industry
- Outstanding Family Advocate from the Louisiana Family Forum
- Best U.S. Coin Book 2012 award for American Numismatist

Hollis was nominated by former Louisiana House Speaker Chuck Kleckley to serve as a member of the Louisiana Commission on Marriage and Family. He is also a member of the newly formed Gulf Coast Legislative Council.
