= Margaret Kelly (pharmacologist) =

American pharmacologist (1906–1968)

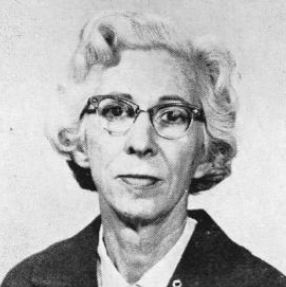
- Born: Margaret Georgia Kelly; 1906; Minneapolis, Minnesota, US
- Died: May 5, 1968
- Education: George Washington University
- Scientific career
- Fields: Pharmacology
- Workplaces: Walter Reed Army Institute of Research; National Cancer Institute
- Thesis: Pharmacological Actions and Physiological Disposition of Podophyllotoxin and Picropodophyllin (1951)

Margaret Georgia Kelly (October 5, 1906 − May 5, 1968) was an American pharmacologist specialized in the pharmacology of drugs used in cancer chemotherapy, carcinogenesis, and chemical protection against radiation and alkylating agents. Kelly was a senior investigator in the National Cancer Institute's laboratory of chemical pharmacology.

== Early life and education ==
Margaret Georgia Kelly was born in 1906 in Minneapolis. She attended the University of Minnesota from 1923 to 1927. While working at the National Cancer Institute (NCI) she continued her studies at George Washington University. She received the B.S. degree in chemistry in 1941, the M.S. degree in biochemistry in 1945, and the Ph.D. in pharmacology in 1951. The thesis for her master's degree was titled Nutritional Requirements of Normal and Malignant Cells: Effect of Growth Fibroblasts on the Composition of the Culture Medium. Her doctoral dissertation in 1951 was titled Pharmacological Actions and Physiological Disposition of Podophyllotoxin and Picropodophyllin.

== Career ==
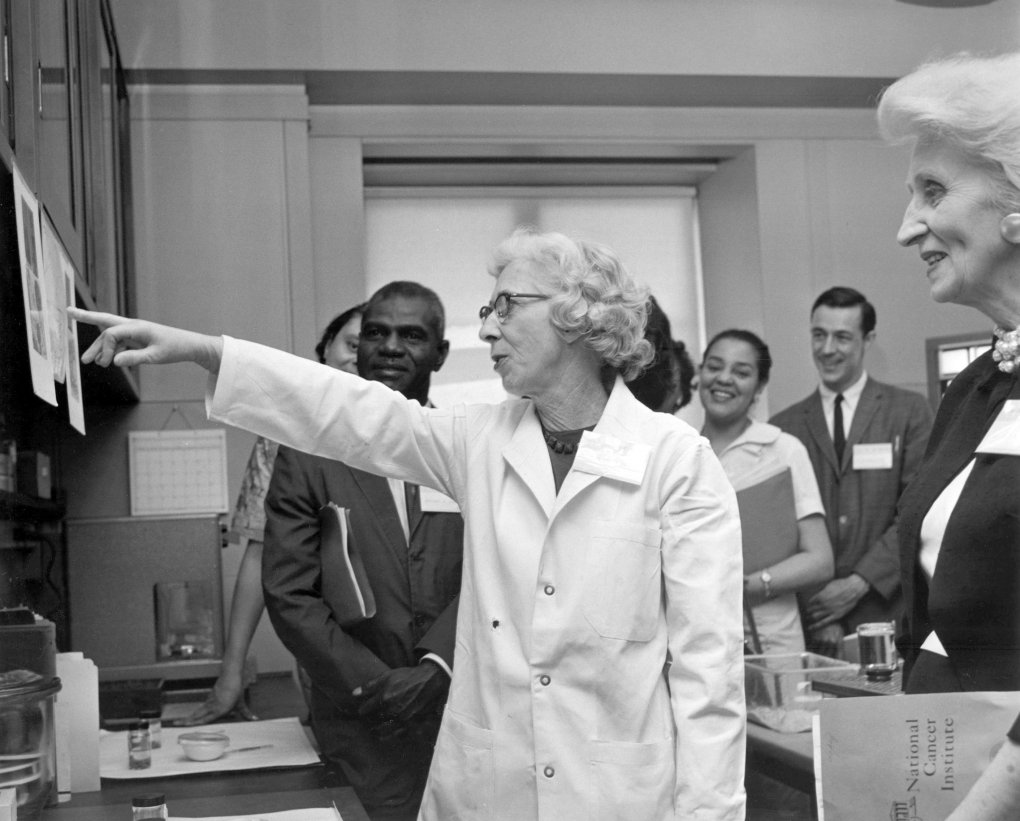
Kelly at the National Cancer Institute.

Kelly worked for a group of pathologists in the Washington area, and later, for the Walter Reed Army Institute of Research. Kelly joined the National Cancer Institute (NCI) in 1940 as a medical technician in the laboratory of pathology. She was a senior investigator in the laboratory of chemical pharmacology at the time of her death.

=== Research ===
Kelly's research interests included the pharmacology of drugs used in cancer chemotherapy, carcinogenesis, and chemical protection against radiation and alkylating agents. She focused on what caused cancer and what drugs could be used to fight it, establishing a monkey colony which resulted in her being able to grow tumors in tissue culture and looking at about 3000 chemicals to find a few that might work as cancer treatments. Her studies with laboratory animals showed that sulfhydryl compounds may protect against toxicity from x-irradiation and alkylating agents by a distribution pattern which causes more of a protective compound to accumulate in the sensitive tissues than in the tumor. She also demonstrated that newborn mice are as sensitive to chemical carcinogens as they are to viral carcinogens.

In her final studies, Kelly established one of the first rhesus monkey breeding colonies in this area for the study of carcinogenicity in primates. She used these animals to produce the first consistently reproducible primate tumor, a liver tumor induced by diethylnitrosamine. These induced liver tumors produced an alpha fetoprotein similar to that produced by human hepatomas. Kelly succeeded in growing this tumor in tissue culture. In collaboration with Michael Walker, a neurosurgeon, she developed techniques for adapting this tumor to grow within the monkey brain as a quasi-metastatic type of cerebral neoplasm. This research gave scientists a prototype primary liver tumor for chemotherapeutic experiments. It also provided a prototype metastatic brain tumor for chemotherapeutic and pharmacologic experiments.

== Personal life ==
Kelly was married to fellow researcher, Rodger W. O'Gara, a pathologist at NCI with whom she collaborated. She died of cancer on May 5, 1968 in the NIH Clinical Center.

== Selected works ==
- Kelly, Margaret G.; Hartwell, Jonathan L. (February 1954). "The Biological Effects and the Chemical Composition of Podophyllin. A Review". Journal of the National Cancer Institute. 14 (4): 967–1010. doi:10.1093/jnci/14.4.967. ISSN 0027-8874.
- Rall, David P.; Loo, Ti Li; Lane, Montague; Kelly, Margaret G. (July 1957). "Appearance and Persistence of Fluorescent Material in Tumor Tissue after Tetracycline Administration". Journal of the National Cancer Institute. 19 (1): 79–85. doi:10.1093/jnci/19.1.79. ISSN 0027-8874. PMID 13502707.
