= Frank Edgar Scobey =

Director of the United States Mint (1866–1931)

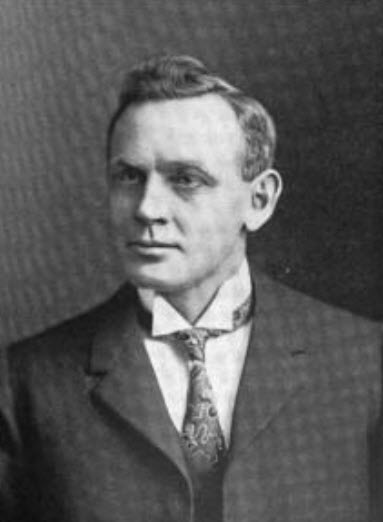
- Frank Edgar Scobey

26th Director of the United States Mint
- In office March 1922 – September 1923
- President: Warren G. Harding; Calvin Coolidge
- Preceded by: Raymond T. Baker
- Succeeded by: Robert J. Grant

Personal details
- Born: February 27, 1866 Miami County, Ohio, U.S.
- Died: February 7, 1931 (aged 64) San Antonio, Texas, U.S.
- Party: Republican
- Spouse: Mayme Barrington
- Parent(s): William Scobey (father); Martha J. Vandeveer (mother)
- Occupation: Businessman, government official

Frank Edgar Scobey (1866–1931) was an American government official and businessman who was Director of the United States Mint from 1922 to 1923.

== Biography ==
Frank Edgar Scobey was born in Miami County, Ohio on February 27, 1866, the son of William Scobey and Martha J. (Vandeveer) Scobey. He attended public schools in Troy, Ohio.

After school, Scobey secured a position as Troy agent for Standard Oil. Scobey later fell ill and sold his business, spending three full years traveling to try to improve his health, wintering in Florida and Texas. He married Mayme Barrington of Covington, Ohio on May 7, 1889. He formed a livery business with his uncle, J. F. Vandeveer, in 1894.

As a young man, Scobey was active in the Miami County Republican Party. In 1897, he was elected sheriff of Miami County. He was re-elected, holding office until his resignation in January 1902.

A supporter of U.S. Senator Joseph B. Foraker, Scobey then became Clerk of the Ohio Senate through Foraker's influence. During this period, Scobey became a personal friend of Warren G. Harding, who was a member of the Ohio Senate from 1899 to 1903. Scobey maintained a correspondence with Harding even after Scobey moved to San Antonio in 1907 to found the Scobey Fireproof Storage Co.

When Harding became President of the United States in the 1920 U.S. presidential election, he appointed Scobey Director of the United States Mint. He held that office from March 1922 until September 1923.

Scobey died in San Antonio in 1931.

Government offices
Preceded by Raymond T. Baker	Director of the United States Mint; March 1922 – September 1923	Succeeded by Robert J. Grant
