= Margaret Kelly (civil servant) =

American civil servant

Margaret Kelly was an American civil servant, notable for being the first female Assistant Director of the United States Mint, at that time the highest official position held by a woman.

She grew up in New Hampshire, in a politically unconnected family, and was educated in Boston. In 1896 she passed the stenography test and entered the civil service. For the first year she worked in the office of the Appointments Clerk in the Treasury Department. Then she transferred to the Mint, and worked her way up from stenographer over 14 years, to assistant to George E. Roberts.

Edward T. Taylor, a congressman from Colorado, considered her position "an epoch in the history and development of women in the business world". Kelly supported votes for women and equal pay for men and women, but was not an active suffragette. Popular Mechanics magazine called her the best paid woman on the government payroll.

== Sources ==
- New York Times Sunday Magazine, 6 August 1911. Reprinted 6 August 2011 here.
