= Philip N. Diehl =

American businessman and former monetary policy advisor

35th Director of the United States Mint
- In office June 1994 – March 2000
- President: Bill Clinton
- Preceded by: David J. Ryder
- Succeeded by: Jay W. Johnson

Personal details
- Born: June 11, 1951 (age 75) Dallas, Texas, U.S.
- Party: Democratic
- Spouse: Jacquita Pearson
- Children: 2
- Education: Austin College (BA); University of Texas at Austin (MA)

Philip Noel Diehl (born June 11, 1951) is an American businessman and former monetary policy advisor who served as the 35th director of the United States Mint. He is the president of U.S. Money Reserve, a published analyst of gold markets and a member of the boards of the Industry Council for Tangible Assets, the Coalition for Equitable Regulation and Taxation and the Gold and Silver Political Action Committee.

== Early life and education ==
Diehl was born in Dallas, Texas to Will A Diehl, a decorated World War II pilot who flew The Hump, and the former Wandah Marguerite Findley.

Diehl graduated from Lubbock High School in Lubbock, Texas and earned a Bachelor of Arts degree from Austin College where he was a member of Sigma Tau Epsilon and active in political organizing on campus and in the community. He earned a Master of Arts degree in government from the University of Texas at Austin and received a fellowship for post-graduate work in political science at Stanford University.

== Career ==
=== Early career ===
Diehl's involvement in the Democratic Party began at Austin College where he worked in the re-election campaign of United States Senator Ralph Yarborough. In 1973, Diehl joined Bob Bullock's first campaign for Texas Comptroller of Public Accounts.

When Diehl returned to Austin from Stanford, he worked for Bullock at the Texas Comptroller's Office. Later, he held positions as assistant to Commissioner Dennis L. Thomas and director of telephone regulation at the Public Utility Commission of Texas (PUC).

At the PUC, Diehl oversaw changes in the regulation of telecommunications utilities in the wake of the Bell system divestiture. He was the PUC's liaison to the Texas Legislature during a major reform of state laws regulating the telecommunications industry, and he led the commission's opposition to AT&T's attempt at deregulation by the legislature. The proposal was defeated, and the legislature mandated the PUC to hold a market dominance case to determine whether AT&T retained market power. Diehl led the case against AT&T's deregulation. The PUC determined that AT&T retained market power, and the decision was upheld on appeal in state district court.

Diehl also led the PUC's adoption of Lifeline rates and Link Up Texas, the state's first programs to make telephone service affordable to low-income households, and he spearheaded creation of Texas Relay Service, the state's program making telecom service available to the deaf. In 1988, Diehl joined Dallas-based International Telecharge, Inc. as Vice President of Regulatory Affairs where he was responsible for state regulatory and legislative matters and was the company's expert witness in administrative law and appeals court proceedings.

In January 1991, Diehl was named legislative director to U.S. Senator Lloyd Bentsen. In September 1992, the Senator promoted him to majority staff director of the Senate Finance Committee. On the first day of the Clinton administration, Diehl moved to the U.S. Treasury Department and was named Chief of Staff to Treasury Secretary Bentsen.

=== Director of the United States Mint ===
After serving as staff director of the Senate Finance Committee and chief of staff of the U.S. Treasury, Diehl was nominated by President Bill Clinton to be Director of the United States Mint. He was unanimously confirmed by the United States Senate and served in the position until March 2000.

Diehl led a dramatic turnaround of the Mint. By the time he left the agency in March 2000, he had persuaded Congress to exempt the Mint from all procurement regulations and annual appropriations, eliminated nine of ten political patronage positions, and resolved the Mint's long-standing financial management weaknesses. Diehl also persuaded Congress to reform the Mint's troubled commemorative coin program and oversaw the Mint's launch of one of the Internet's most successful E-commerce sites at the time. In 1998, a four-year customer service initiative Diehl launched culminated in the Mint earning the second-highest customer satisfaction rating on the University of Michigan School of Business American Customer Satisfaction Index in 1999., trailing only Mercedes Benz, and he was named by Vice President Gore to lead a governmentwide customer satisfaction initiative.

During his term as director, the Mint increased annual profits, which are returned to the American taxpayer, from $727 million to $2.6 billion.

Working with Representative Michael Castle, Diehl overcame opposition from the Treasury Department to enact the 50 State Quarters program and oversaw its successful launch. He negotiated agreements with Walmart and General Mills that led to a highly successful launch of the Sacagawea dollar, though the effort fizzled later.

Diehl also co-authored with Rep. Castle a law authorizing the Mint to produce the nation's first platinum coin, the American Platinum Eagle bullion coin. Within six months of its launch the Platinum Eagle had taken an 80% share of the world market for platinum bullion coins.

In January 2013, the platinum coin law received widespread media attention when Paul Krugman, a Nobel Prize–winning economist, and Laurence Tribe, a prominent constitutional law professor at the Harvard School of Law, endorsed a proposal to use the law to mint a trillion-dollar coin. The idea was proposed as a way to neutralize Republican threats to block an increase in the statutory debt ceiling thereby causing the nation to default on its debt. Diehl was widely cited in the media as an expert on the issue, debunking criticism of the proposal and its legality under U.S. coinage law and its constitutionality.

=== Later career ===
Upon leaving the Mint, Diehl was named president of Zales.com, the online business platform of the Dallas-based jewelry retailer. In the wake of the dot-com bubble, he returned to Washington, DC to join the international public relations firm FleishmanHillard as president of the company's government relations department. He also established the company's B2G (business-to-government) practice and opened its Middle East office in Cairo, Egypt. In 2007, he formed a consulting firm with clients in the Middle East and the U.S.

Diehl is now a consultant to companies in the precious metals industry and an analyst of gold markets. His work has appeared in The Wall Street Journal and Institutional Investor. He serves on the boards of the Industry Council for Tangible Assets (ICTA) and the Coalition for Equitable Regulation and Taxation (CERT), and he is a co-founder of the Gold and Silver Political Action Committee.

== Awards and recognition ==
Diehl has been recognized by Advertising Age as among its Top 100 in Marketing and received the American Society for Public Administration Government Executive Leadership Award, the Faith and Politics Institute's St. Joseph's Day Award for values-based leadership, and the Treasury Medal for Outstanding Public Service awarded by Treasury Secretary Lawrence Summers. Austin College has named him a Distinguished Alumni.

His work at the Mint has been featured in Fast Company, the New York Times, The Washington Post, The Leadership Challenge by James M. Kouzes and Barry Z. Posner, The Art and Science of Leadership (5th Edition) by Afsaneh Nahavandi, and at the National Press Club luncheon series.

== Personal life ==
He is married to the former Jacquita Pearson. They have two sons, Soren Michael and Alex Douglas.

Government offices
Preceded by David J. Ryder	Director of the United States Mint; June 1994 – March 2000	Succeeded by Jay W. Johnson
