= Coin World =

American numismatic magazine

- Monthly magazine version cover from August 2018
- Type: Weekly, Monthly
- Format: Magazine
- Owner: Amos Press
- Editor: Jake Utz
- Founded: March 1960; 66 years ago
- Language: English
- Headquarters: Sidney, OH
- Price: $2.50
- ISSN: 0010-0447
- Website: coinworld.com

Coin World is an American numismatic magazine, with weekly and monthly issues. It is among the world's most popular non-academic publications for coin collectors and is covering the entire numismatic field, including coins, paper money, medals and tokens.

== Founding and early history (1960–1962) ==
Coin World was founded as a weekly publication in 1960 by J. Oliver Amos, a seasoned publishing professional from the third generation of newspaper publishers. Amos took his experiences in producing the Sidney Daily News to the coin field, applying what he learned from printing Linn's Stamp News. In 1960, the concept of a weekly coin publication was new. On the 25th anniversary of' Coin World in 1985, Amos related that he saw, "all the opportunities which could be developed from a weekly presentation – club meetings all over the country, personalities, and many other ideas that we had learned in publishing The Sidney Daily News as a community newspaper."

With the help of James F. Kelly of Dayton, Ohio, the idea to include a weekly "Trends" column reflecting the changes in coin values was formed. Kelly was hired to be the inaugural Coin World Trends editor and D. Wayne Johnson of Shawnee Mission, Kansas, was tapped to be the inaugural editor-in-chief.

The Sample Edition (Vol. 1 No. 0) was printed March, 1960, and its eight pages were designed to show potential subscribers and advertisers the look of the new publication. The first official issue was dated April 21, 1960. Within a year there were more than 53,000 paid subscribers. That same year, Q. David Bowers began writing a column called "Numismatic Depth Study" for the magazine, which ran until 1992.

== Margo Russell period (1962–1985) ==
Margo Russell became Coin World's editor in 1962. She had begun her journalism career at The Sidney Daily News and later joined the Coin World staff as a historical researcher. Upon her retirement as editor on February 28, 1985, after 23 years, many numismatists regarded her as one of the most influential people in the hobby, and had given her the nickname “The First Lady of Numismatics”. In 1975, Russell received the Farran Zerbe Memorial Award, the highest award of the American Numismatic Association and in 1986 she was elected to its Hall of Fame.

Under Russell's editorship, Coin World took a substantial role in promoting the growth of the hobby by cultivating close relationships with the U.S. Mint. Russell took an unprecedented role in expressing the desires of coin collectors and shaping the direction of the hobby through her efforts in Washington, D.C.

In 1976, Q. David Bowers began his long-running column "The Joys of Collecting", which ran until 2021.

== Beth Deisher period (1985–2012) ==
Upon Margo Russell's retirement in 1985, Beth Deisher became editor and continued in that capacity until 2012, making her the publication's longest-serving editor.

Deisher was the lead witness at the July 12, 1995, congressional hearing that catapulted the drive for circulating commemoratives to the top of the U.S. Congress's legislative agenda, eventually resulting in approval of the legislation authorizing the 50 State Quarters program.

Digital editions of Coin World first became available on the magazine's website in November 2002. During Deisher's tenure as editor, supplement magazines were launched. Coin World's Coin Values began in October 2003. It was published until February 2011, after which it was absorbed into the monthly Coin World issues. Paper Money Values debuted in 2005 and ran through 2010, and WorldWide Coins, which focused on trends of Mexican, Canadian, and British coins, was published intermittently 14 times between November 2007 and January 2010. In 2007, the magazine launched Presidential Dollars to focus on the Mint's newest small-sized dollar coins, but only one issue was ever published.

== Steve Roach Period (2012–2024) ==
Steve Roach, previously Coin World's associate editor, took over as editor-in-chief on April 30, 2012.

Coin World's reporting also includes coverage of stories about the global numismatic field, including the recent deluge into the numismatic marketplace of counterfeit Chinese coins.

In March 2019, Coin World launched a weekly podcast hosted by associate editors Chris Bulfinch and senior staff writer Jeff Starck. Larry Jewett replaced Bulfinch in January 2021. As part of Coin Worlds 60th anniversary, in March 2021, a supplementary book, Coin World Celebrating 60: The Most Influential People in Numismatics 1960-2020, was published and sent to subscribers with the March 2021 issue. The people listed were voted on by Coin World subscribers and the collecting public. This has since become an annual supplemental publication. In August 2023, a supplemental, Top 100 U.S. Rare Coins was published.

In April 2023, the magazine reduced its page count by elimination the monthly coin values section, which proved to be very unpopular. The next month, the valuations were restored, and the magazine reduced its World Coins and Paper Money coverage. In May, Coin World Trends was re-launched as a supplement with the monthly issues, and continued to be published through 2024. In April 2024, a printing dispute arose between Amos Media and their contracted printer, which caused a lapse in print issues between spring and winter 2024. During that time, many contributors took a leave of absence or left the magazine entirely: Steve Roach left the magazine in December 2024, senior editor Jeff Starck joined Active Interest Media, Chris Bulfinch joined the auction industry, and senior editor Paul Gilkes moved into "semi-retirement".

== Larry Jewett and Jake Utz era (2025-present) ==
In December 2025, William T. Gibbs retired as managing editor after serving 49 years with the publication and was succeeded by Larry Jewett. Jewett left to join Whitman Publishing in February 2026, and Jake Utz was promoted to managing editor in 2026.

== Content ==
Each issue features a variety of columns in addition to news stories.

- News and Analysis: Column focusing on current events in the numismatic world such as auctions, finds, and convention news
- Readers Ask: Reader supported question and answer column
- Editorial Opinion: Column on current events from an editorial perspective
- Coin Values Spotlight: An in-depth look comparing two specific coins and tracking their value appreciations/depreciations over time
- Coin Values Market Analysis: Focusing on recent auctions of notable coins
- Coin Shop Lottery: Thomas Cohn's column on his recent purchases
- About VAMs: Morgan Dollar column by variety specialist John Roberts
- The Joys Of Collecting: Q. David Bowers' column (1976–2021)
- Collecting Paper: Paper money column
- Collectors' Clearinghouse: Errors and Varieties: Error coin column by Mike Diamond featuring reader-submitted coins
