= Half eagle =

Gold $5 coin of the United States

Half Eagle
- United States
- Value: 5 U.S. dollars (face value)
- Diameter: 25 mm (0.98 in) (1795–1829); 23.8 mm (0.94 in) (1829–1834); 22.5 mm (0.89 in) (1834–1840); 21.6 mm (0.85 in) (after 1840)
- Edge: Reeded
- Composition: 91.67% Au, 3% Ag, 5.33% Cu (1795–1834); 89.92% Au, 10.08% Ag & Cu (1834–1837); 90% Au, 10% Cu (after 1837)
- Years of minting: 1795–1929 (circulating); 1983–present (bullion coin)

Obverse
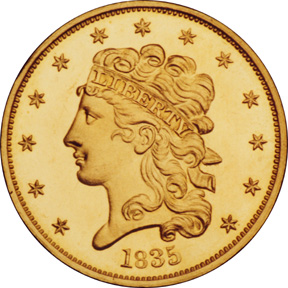
- Design: Classic Head
- Designer: William Kneass
- Design used: 1834–1839

Reverse
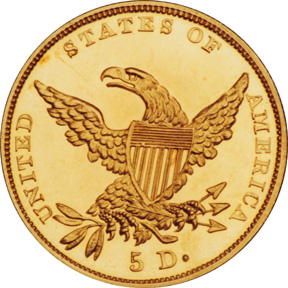

The half eagle is a Coin of the United States dollar that was produced for circulation from 1795 to 1929 and in commemorative and bullion coins since 1983. Composed almost entirely of gold, its face value of five dollars is half that of the eagle coin. Production of the half eagle was authorized by the Coinage Act of 1792, and it was the first gold coin minted by the United States.

== Capped Bust Right ==
Turban Head half eagle
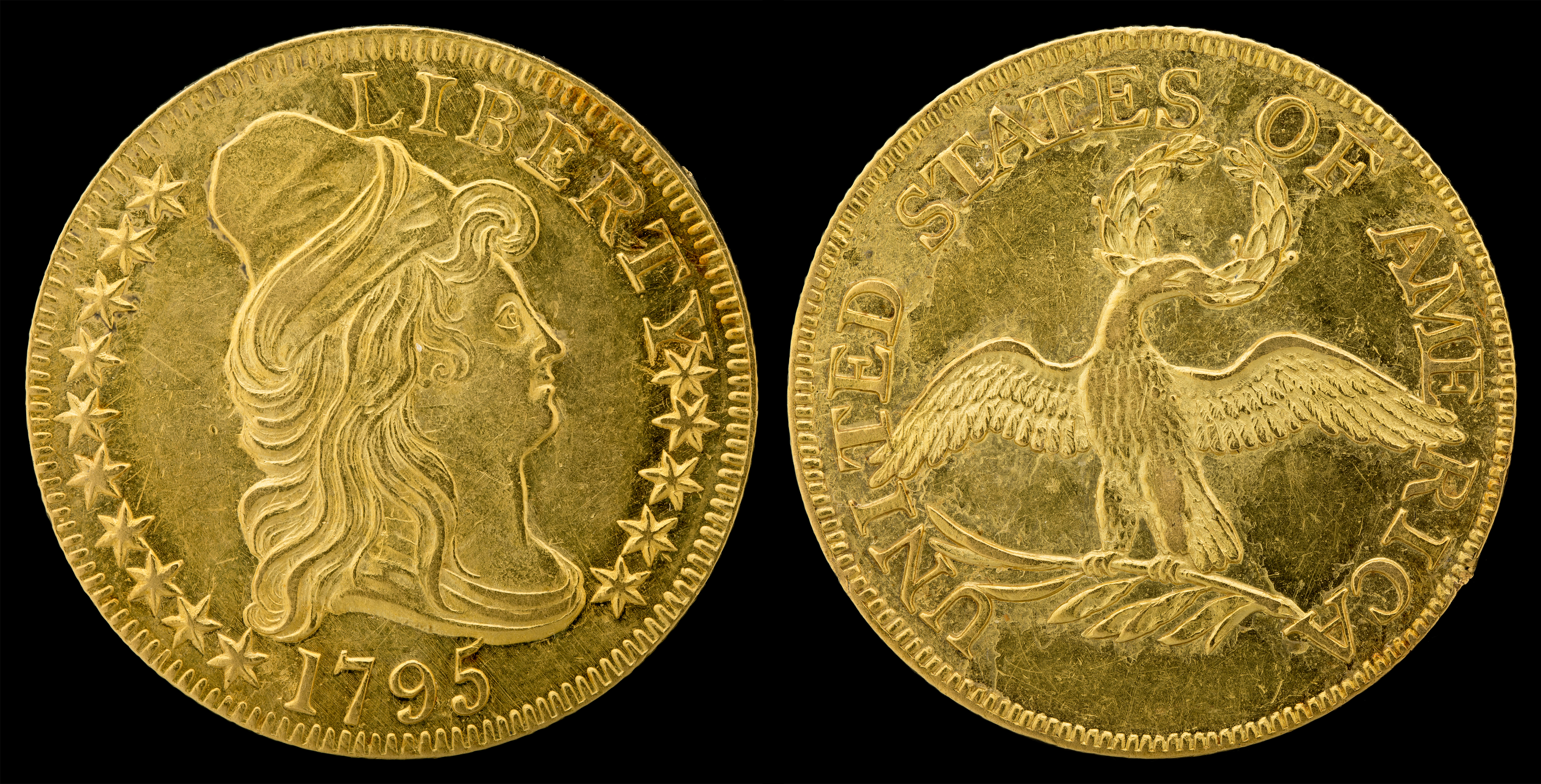
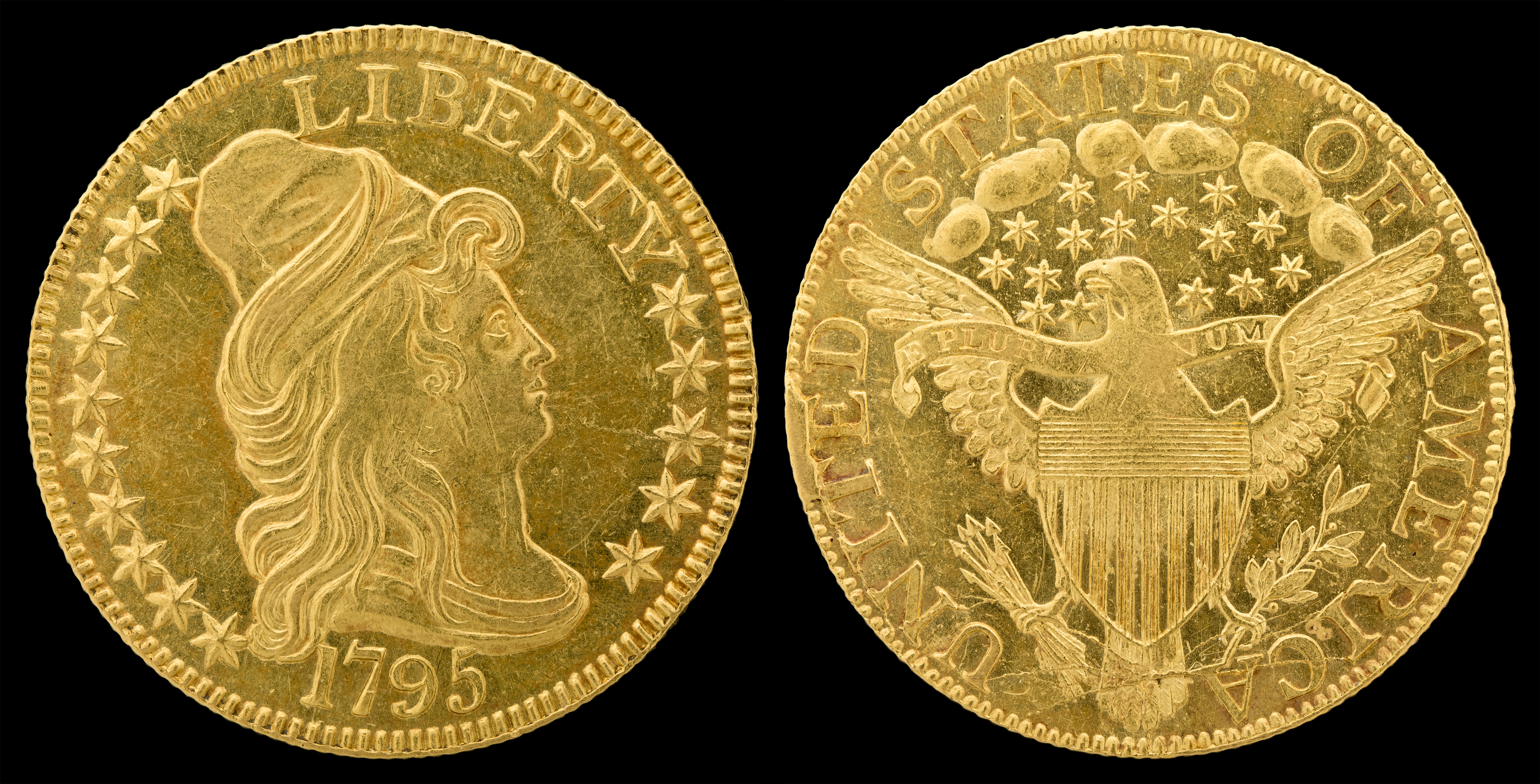
Small eagle (top), heraldic eagle (bottom)

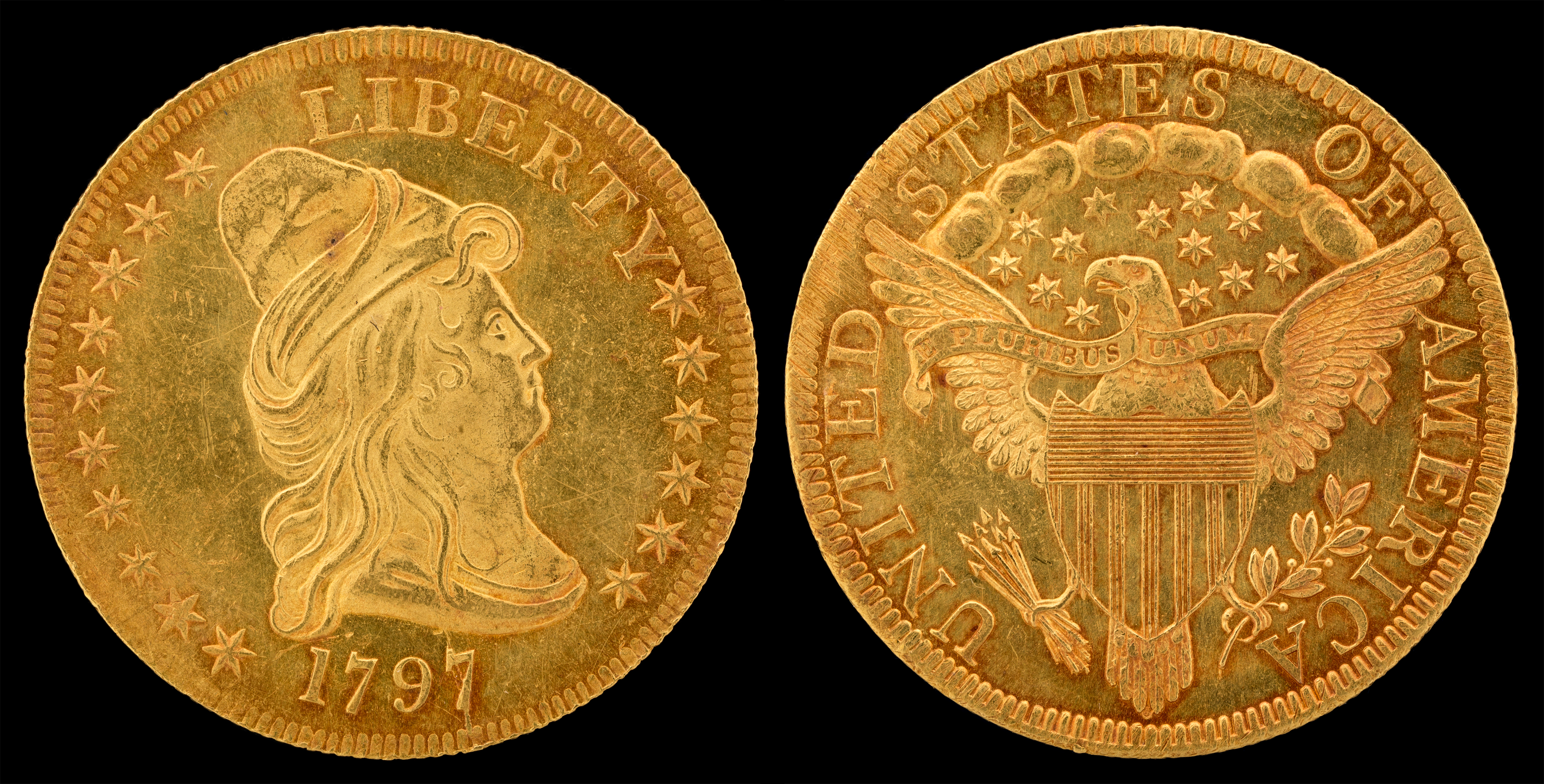
A unique 16-star variety of the 1797 Capped Bust Right half eagle

The design and composition of the half eagle changed many times over the years. The original design was prepared by Robert Scot. At this time the coin contained .9167 gold and .0833 copper and silver. It had a diameter of approximately 25 mm (0.98 in), a weight of 8.75 grams, and a reeded edge. The obverse design, or "Turban Head", depicted Liberty wearing a Phrygian cap, facing to the right. The reverse depicted a small eagle, the design of which was adapted from a first-century Roman onyx cameo housed at the Kunsthistorisches Museum. This type was the first gold coin produced by the new country, with issues from 1795 to 1798. Simultaneously, another type was minted that depicted a larger heraldic eagle on the reverse with the inscription "E PLURIBUS UNUM". This type was produced through 1807.

== Capped Bust Left ==
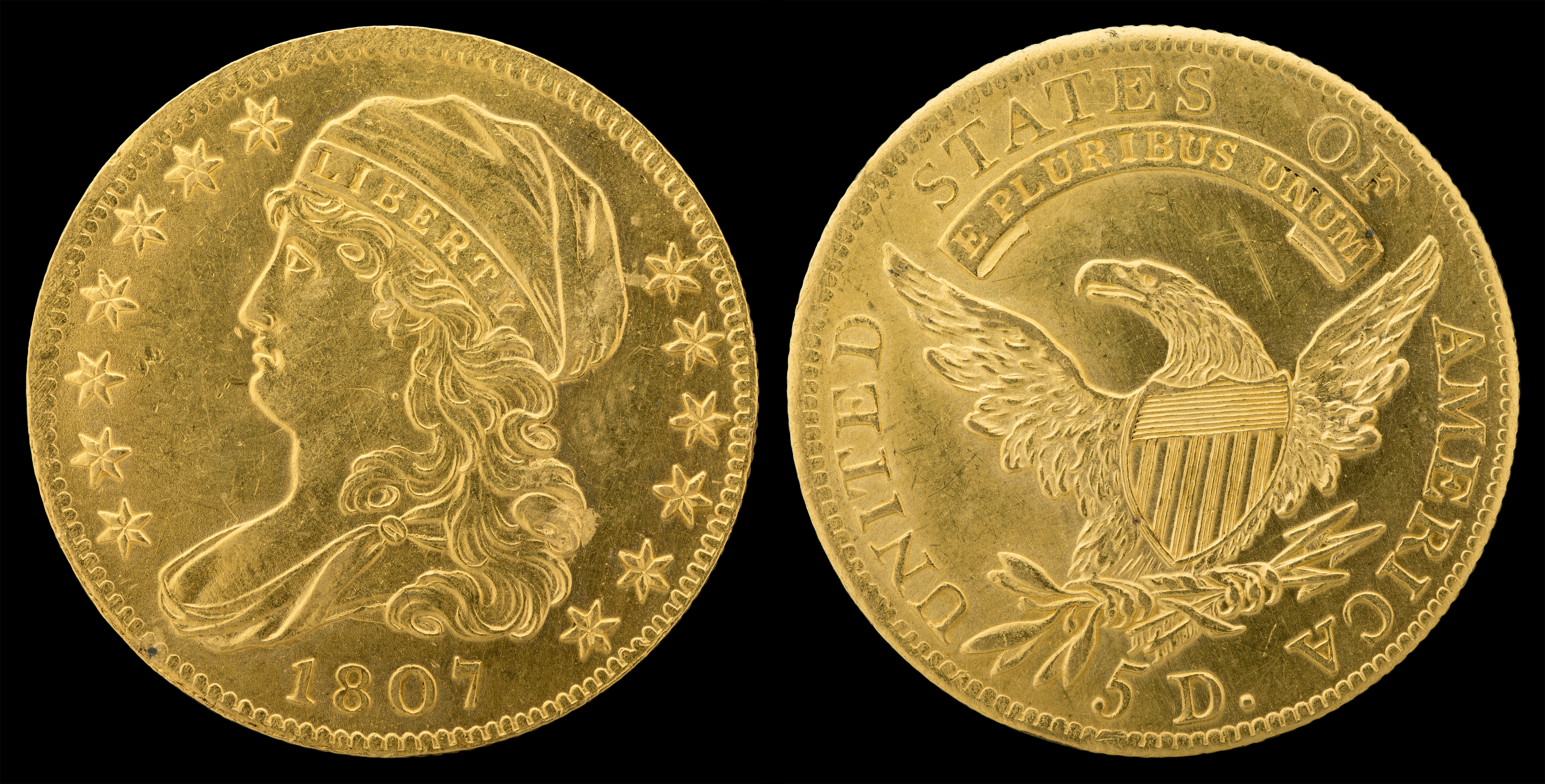
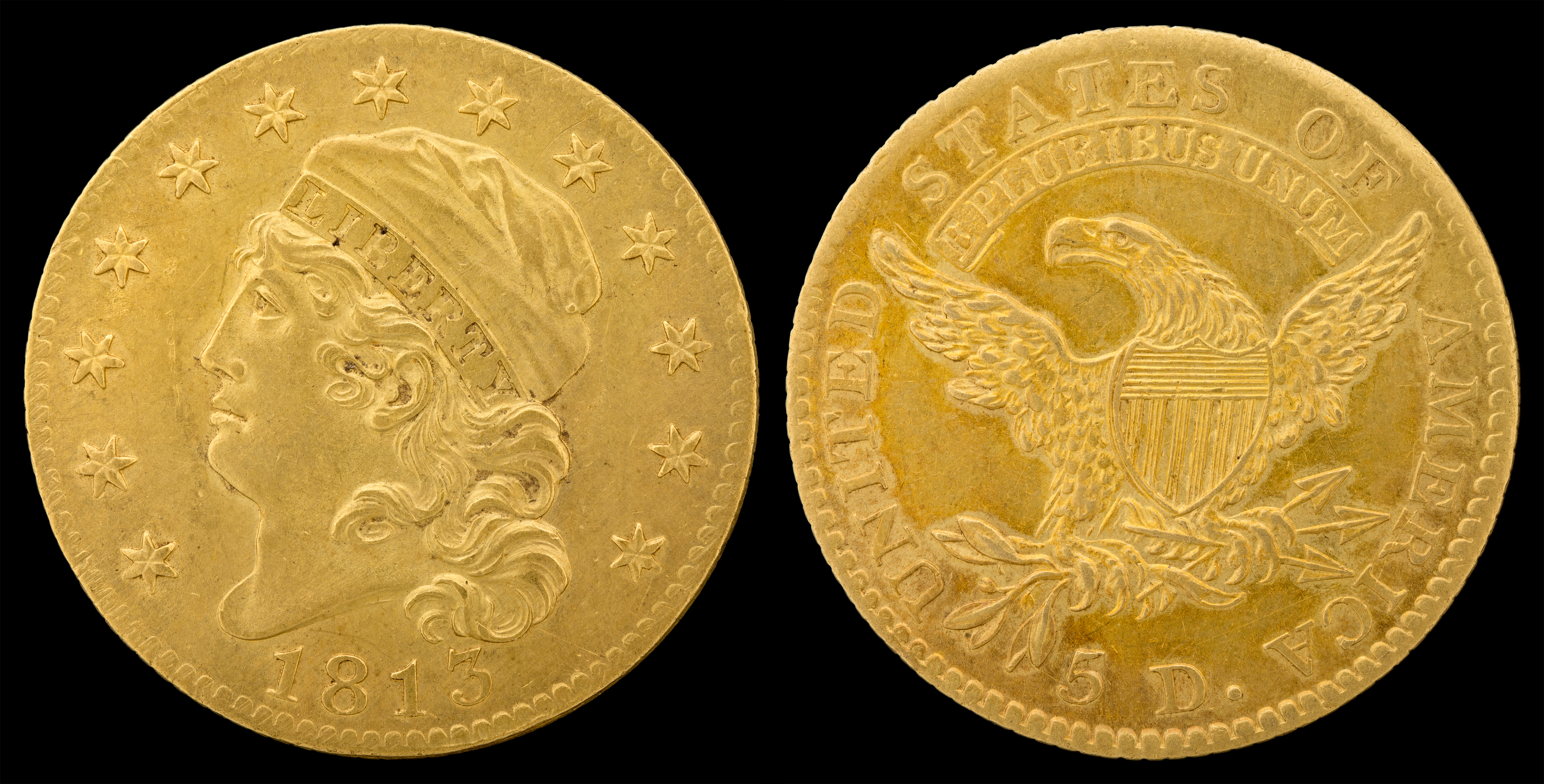
Changes in the Draped Bust (1807 & 1813)

From 1807 to 1812, a new type was produced, referred to as the "Capped Bust Left" (also called the "Draped Bust"), by John Reich. The "Capped Bust Left" design featured a round-capped Liberty facing left on the obverse and a modified eagle on the reverse. For the first time, the value "5 D." was placed on the reverse of the coin to indicate its value. In 1813, a modified version of the Capped Bust Left was introduced, removing much of the bustline ("Capped Head") and giving Liberty an overall larger appearance. This design lasted through 1834. Another modification occurred in 1829 when the diameter of the coin was reduced slightly to 23.8 mm, although the overall design remained unchanged.

== Classic Head ==
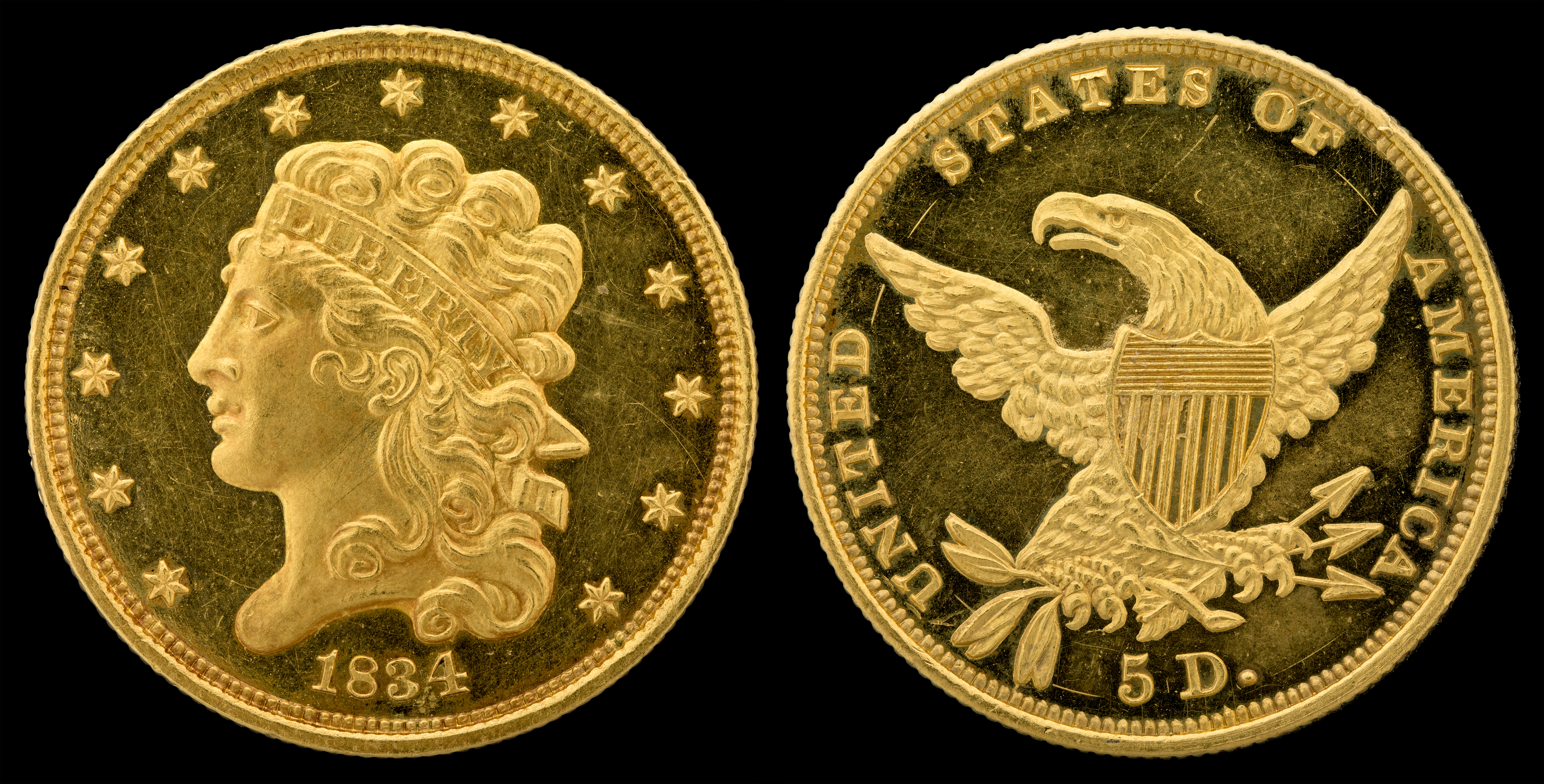
1834 Classic Head half eagle

By 1834, the gold in the half eagle had been worth more than its face value for several years. The Act of June 28, 1834 called for a reduction in the gold used. The weight of the coin was reduced to 8.36 grams, the diameter reduced to 22.5 mm, and the composition changed to .8992 gold and .1008 silver and copper. A new obverse, the "Classic Head", was created by William Kneass for the altered coin. The reverse still depicted the modified eagle introduced in 1813, but "E PLURIBUS UNUM" was removed to further distinguish the new composition. On January 18, 1837, the gold content of this type was increased to .900 in accordance with the Coinage Act of 1837.

== Liberty Head ==
Liberty Head half eagle
(with and without motto)
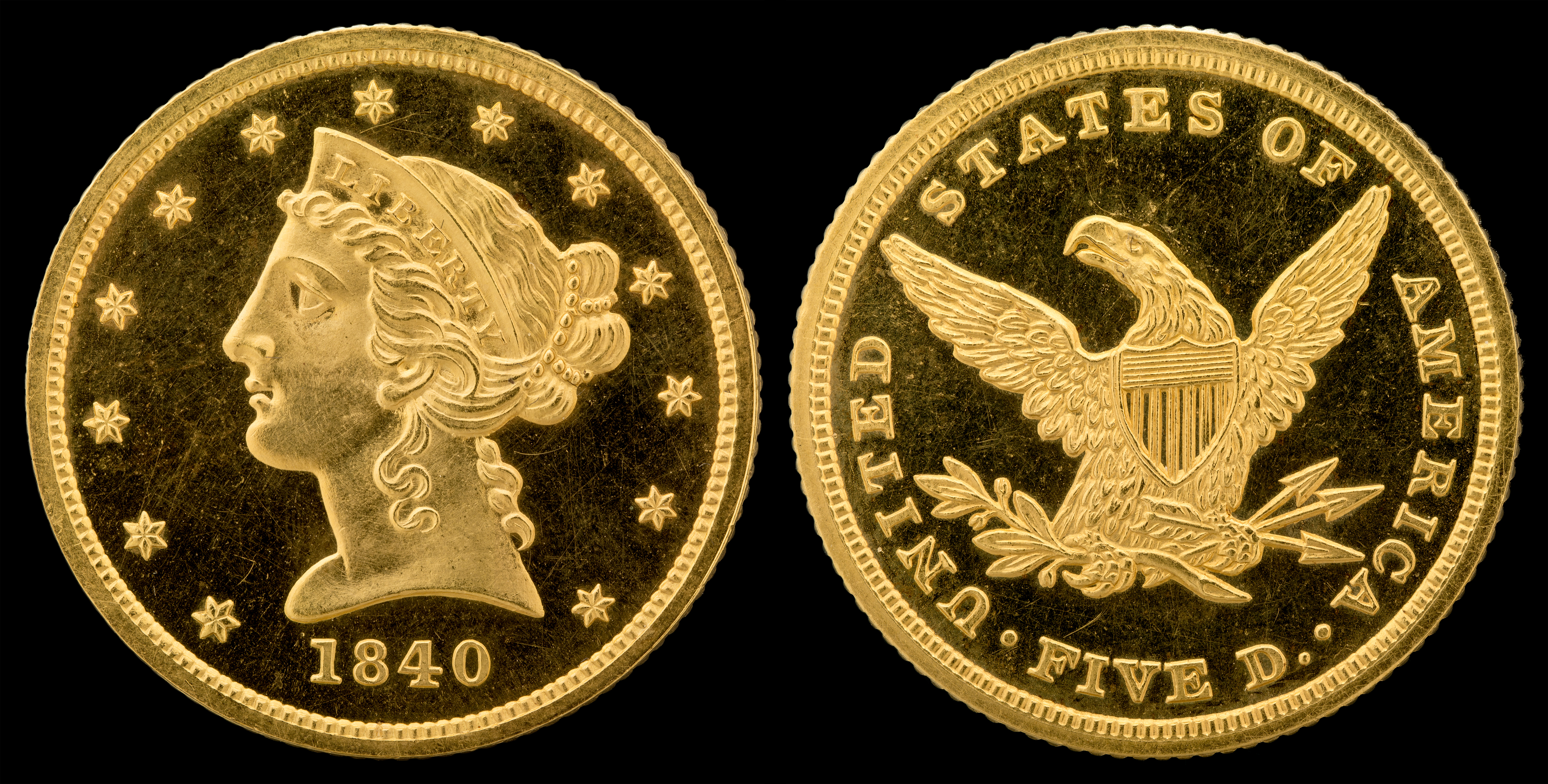
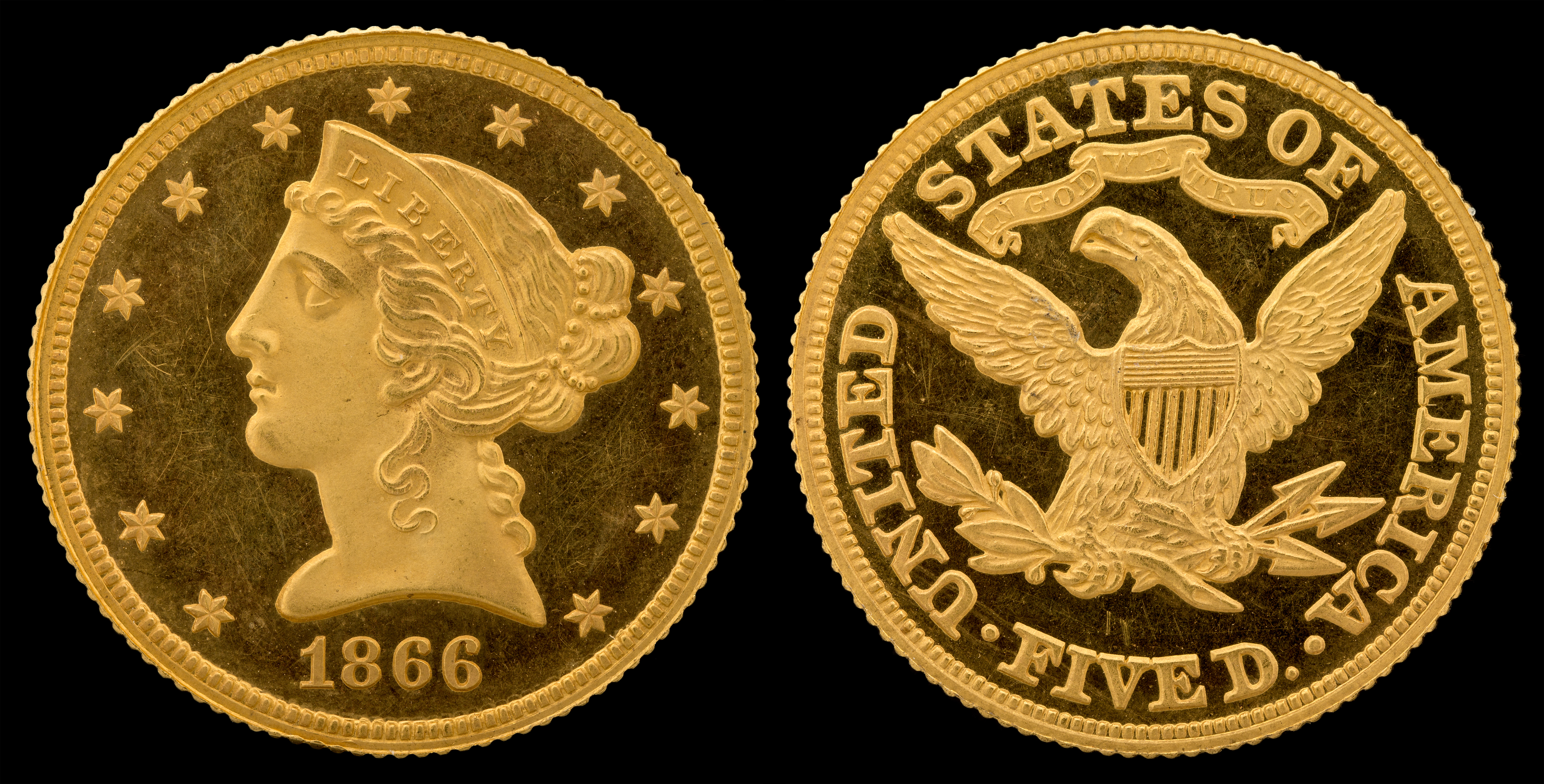

In 1839, the coin was redesigned again. The new obverse was designed by Christian Gobrecht and is known as the "Liberty Head or "Coronet Head". The reverse design remained largely the same, although the value was changed from "5 D." to "FIVE D.".

For those struck at the Philadelphia Mint, there was no longer any silver in the coin — its composition was now .900 gold and .100 copper. However, gold ore used at the southern branch mints of Charlotte and Dahlonega had a high natural silver content, and many of these coins contained up to five percent silver, giving them a distinct so-called "green gold" color.

Its weight was virtually the same, 8.359 grams, but the diameter was reduced one final time, to 21.6 mm, in 1840, for a gold content of 0.242 troy ounce. This design was used for nearly 70 years, from 1839 to 1908, with a modest change in 1866, when "IN GOD WE TRUST" was placed on the reverse above the eagle.

The Liberty Head half eagle is the only coin of a single design to be minted at seven U.S. Mints: Philadelphia, Dahlonega, Charlotte, New Orleans, San Francisco, Carson City, and Denver.

Scarcer dates and coins of higher grades can be worth much more, and all Charlotte, Carson City, and Dahlonega pieces are typically valued above common mints or date runs.

== Indian Head ==
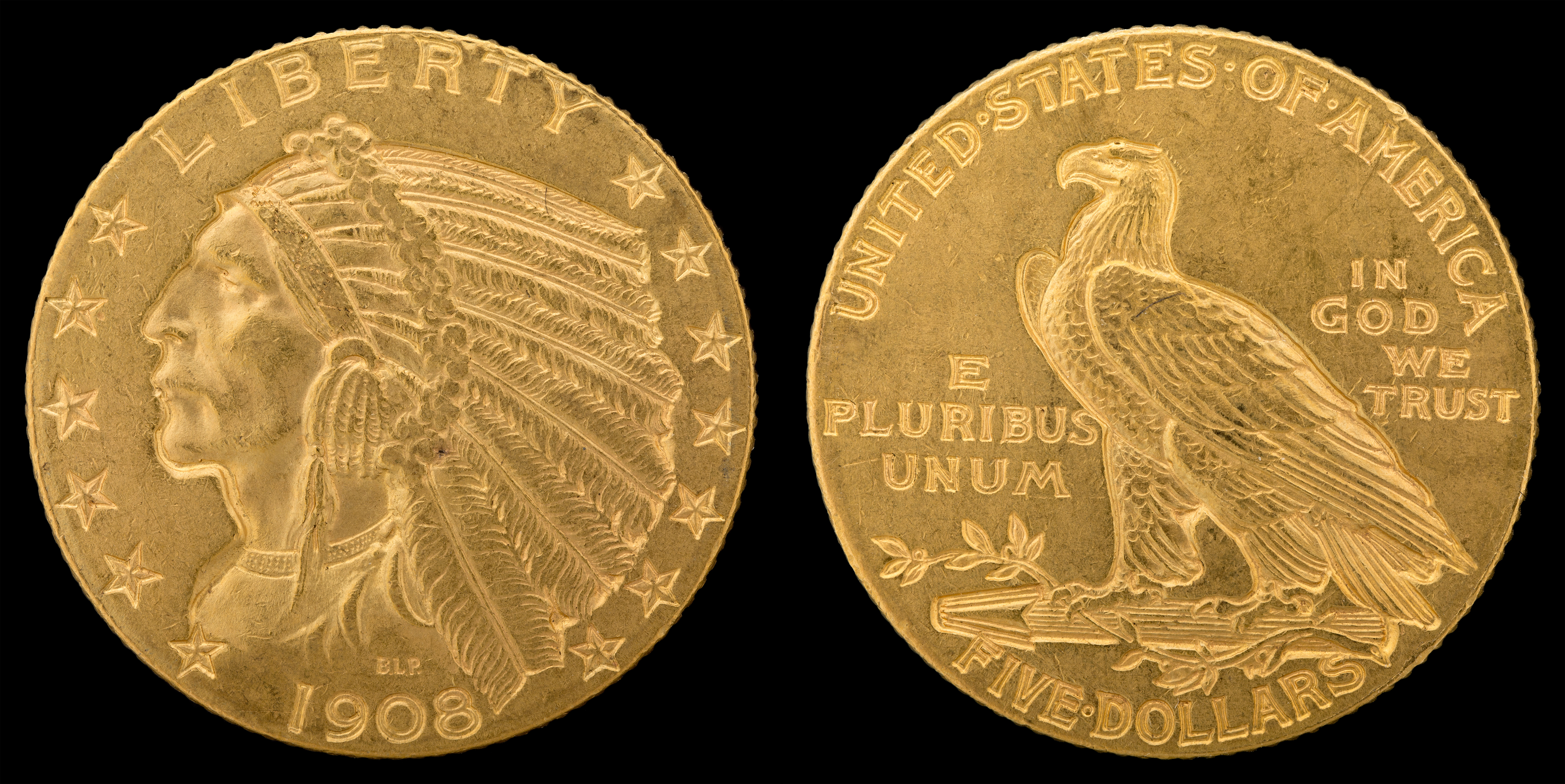
1908 Indian Head half eagle

In 1908, the final type was first produced and designed by Bela Lyon Pratt. The composition, weight, and diameter of the coin remained unchanged, but both the obverse and reverse were drastically altered. The new design matched the new quarter eagle design of the same date. These two series are unique in United States coinage because the design and inscriptions are stamped in incuse, rather than being raised from the surface, meaning that the flat surfaces are the highest points of the coin. The obverse depicted a Native American head wearing a feathered headdress. The reverse depicted a perched eagle with the inscriptions "E PLURIBUS UNUM" and "IN GOD WE TRUST". Production of the half eagle was suspended during World War I and not resumed until 1929, the final year of issue.

Due to higher demand, common date Indian Head half eagles tend to be worth slightly more than common date Liberty Head half eagles.

== Distinctions ==
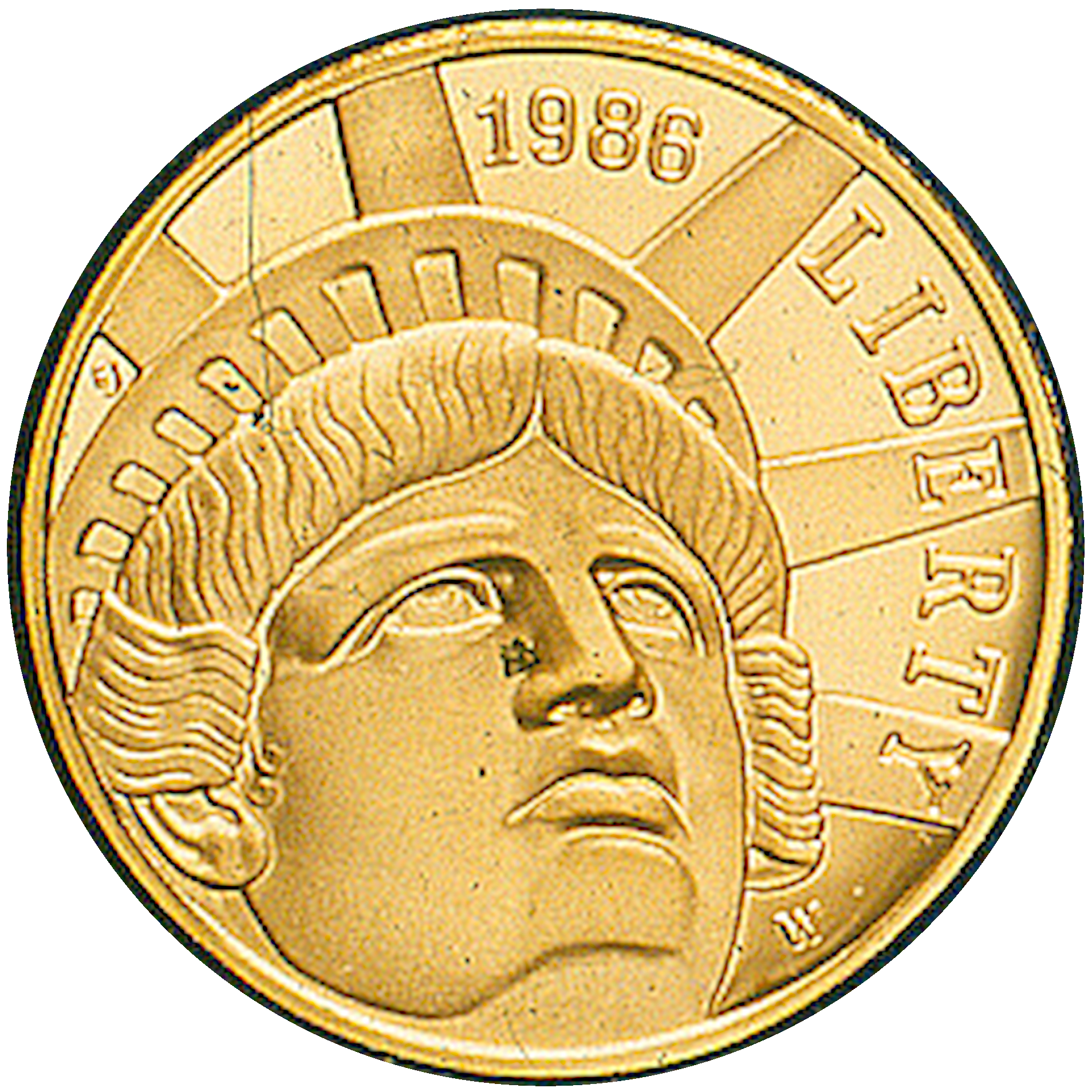
Liberty Enlightening the World depicted on the obverse of its 1986-W 100th anniversary Statue of Liberty commemorative half-eagle

The $5-denomination has the distinction of being the only denomination for which coins were minted at eight U.S. mints. Prior to 1838, all half eagles were minted in Philadelphia because there were no other operating mints. In 1838, the Charlotte Mint and the Dahlonega Mint produced half eagles of the Coronet type in their first years of operation, and continued to mint half eagles until 1861, their last year of operation. The New Orleans Mint minted half eagles from 1840 to 1861. The San Francisco Mint first produced half eagles in 1854, its first year of operation, as did Carson City in 1870, and Denver in 1906.

Although circulating half eagle production was discontinued in 1929, half eagle commemorative and $ 5-denominated (1/10 troy ounce) bullion coins were minted at West Point starting in the late twentieth century.

Proof coins were produced at Philadelphia from 1859 onward.

== List of circulating designs ==
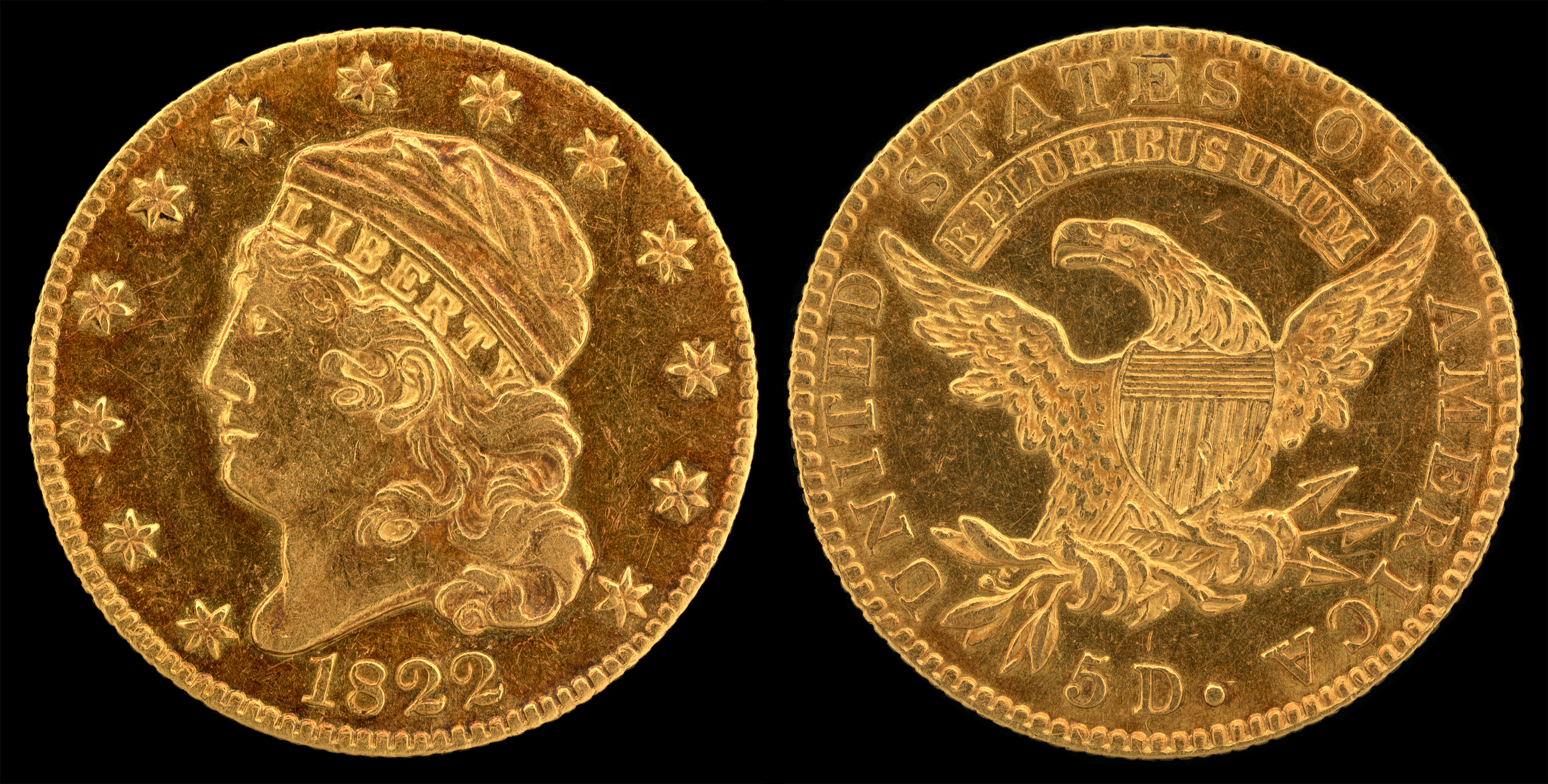
The 1822 Capped Head half eagle (large diameter) is one of only three known for the year

- Turban Head 1795–1807
  - Turban Head, Small Eagle 1795–1798
  - Turban Head, Large Eagle 1795–1807
- Draped Bust 1807–1812
- Capped Head 1813–1834
- Classic Head 1834–1838
- Liberty Head (Coronet) 1839–1908
  - Coronet, without motto 1839–1866
  - Coronet, with motto 1866–1908
- Indian Head 1908–1916, 1929
