= Charlotte Mint =

Historic mint in North Carolina, United States

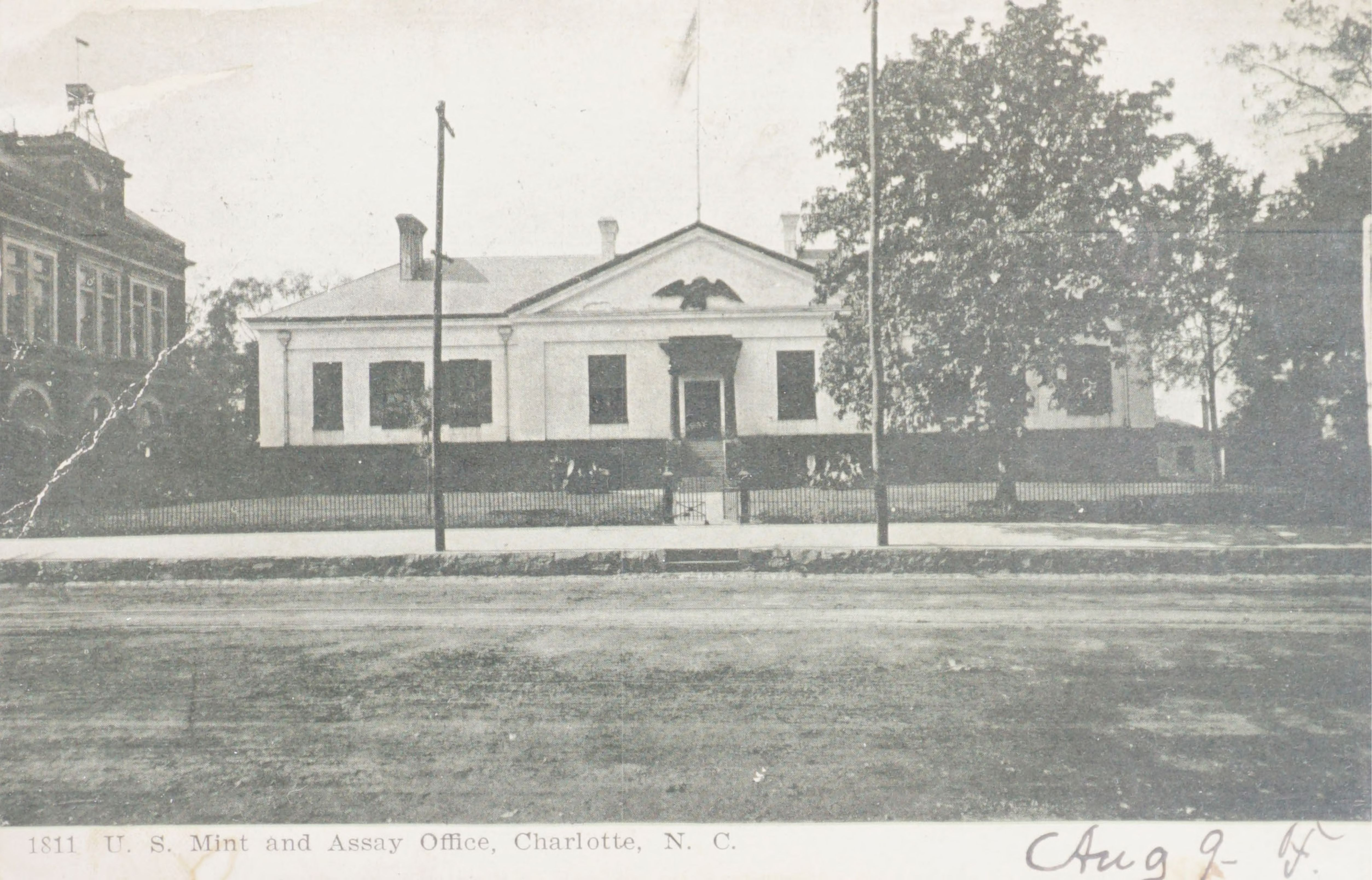
U. S. Mint and Assay Office, Charlotte, North Carolina

The Charlotte Mint was the first United States branch mint. It was located in Charlotte, North Carolina and specialized in gold coinage.

== History ==
Following the first documented discovery of gold in the United States, the country's first gold mine was established in North Carolina at the Reed Gold Mine. Other gold was dug from up to 600 mines in Mecklenburg County, with the primary city source being the Rudisill Gold Mine near downtown. Prior to the creation of a Government mint, gold was made into coins stamped "Bechtler," for the minter. Some miners sent their gold dust to Philadelphia to be melted and coined. The transportation process was difficult, slow, expensive, and dangerous; frustration with this system led to the creation of private gold coining operations in the Charlotte area. However, making gold into local money had its own inherent problems, such as accurate weighing and determining fineness. In the spring of 1831, North Carolina merchants and miners petitioned Congress for a branch mint in the Charlotte region to reduce the risk of transporting gold. They received no response until three years later when the United States Treasury began to investigate private coining operations and recognized North Carolina's need for more federal coinage.

On March 3, 1835, the United States Congress approved legislation to establish several branch mints; the Mint Act of 1835 stated, "...one branch [to be established] at the town of Charlotte, in Mecklenburg County, in the state of North Carolina, for the coinage of gold only...And for the purpose of purchasing sites, erecting suitable buildings, and completing the necessary combinations of machinery...for the branch at Charlotte, fifty thousand dollars". This Act also authorized mints at Dahlonega, Georgia, and New Orleans, Louisiana, after President Andrew Jackson signed it into law.

== Production ==
1848-C quarter eagle

In November, 1835, Levi Woodbury, Secretary of the Treasury, was notified by Samuel MeComb that he had purchased from William Carson and F. L. Smith a full square containing 4 acres of land for $1,500, (Note: equivalent to $46,815 in 2025 adjusted for inflation) which is now the 400 block of West Trade Street. Proposals for erection of the building were advertised and the contract was awarded to Perry & Ligon, of Raleigh, NC on October 15, 1835 at a price of $29,800. (Note: equivalent to $930,048 in 2025 adjusted for inflation) In 1836, construction on the Charlotte Mint began. It opened for business on July 27, 1837. Only raw gold was processed and refined until March 28, 1838, when the first $5 gold half eagle was struck in Charlotte. Later that year, $2½ quarter eagles were minted, and 1849 production started on a small gold dollar. All gold coinage coming from this mint has a "C" mint mark to distinguish it from other sister mints then in operation. The Charlotte Mint issued over $5 million in gold coins over the course of nine years — 1849–1855, 1857, and 1859. Coins produced in 1850, 1852, 1855, and 1859 are considered rare or very rare.

== War ==
In May 1861, North Carolina seceded from the Union. The Confederacy seized the Charlotte Mint along with those at New Orleans and Dahlonega. The Confederate government continued coining operations until October when it became clear it was a futile effort. The mint was then converted into a hospital and military office space for the remainder of the Civil War.

== After the war ==
Federal troops used the offices for the first few years of Reconstruction. In 1867, the U.S. government downgraded it to an assay office due to a shortage of gold dust. In 1873, the General Assembly of North Carolina petitioned Congress to reopen the mint at Charlotte. This request was denied.

The Assay office operated until 1913. From 1917 to 1919, the Charlotte Women's Club met in the building. It also served as a Red Cross station during World War I.

== Museum ==
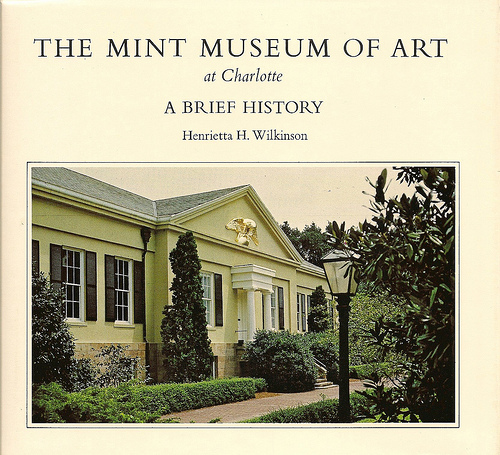
Cover of The Mint Museum of Art at Charlotte, A Brief History

In 1931, the building was to be demolished to make room for the post office expansion next door. A coalition of private citizens acquired the structure from the U.S. Treasury Department in 1933.

They relocated the structure a few miles east of downtown Charlotte, to the historic neighborhood of Eastover on a plot of land donated by E.C. Griffith. In 1936, it was dedicated as the Mint Museum of Art, the first art museum in North Carolina. On display are thousands of items, along with a complete collection of all coins minted at the Charlotte Mint. The museum also includes a reference library with over 15,000 volumes and a theater featuring lectures and performances.

Charlotte Mint gold coins range from scarce to extremely rare; they are some of the most desired items in numismatics today.

== Denominations minted ==
Coin type	Series	Years minted	Image	Notes
Gold dollar	Liberty Head	1849–1854	Upload image	
Gold dollar	Indian Head	1855; 1857; 1859	Upload image	
Quarter eagle	Classic Head	1838–1839	Upload image	
Quarter eagle	Liberty Head	1840–1844; 1846–1852; 1854–1856; 1858; 1860	Upload image	
Half eagle	Classic Head	1838	Upload image	
Half eagle	Liberty Head	1839–1844; 1846–1861		887 coins were produced in May 1861 under the authority of the Confederate States of America.

== See also ==
- List of Mints
- Historical United States mints
- Dahlonega Mint
- Carson City Mint
- Denver Mint
- New Orleans Mint
- Philadelphia Mint
- San Francisco Mint
- California gold coinage
