= New Orleans Mint =

Branch of the United States Mint

- United States Mint, New Orleans Branch; New Orleans Mint; Monnaie de La Nouvelle-Orléans (French)
- U.S. National Register of Historic Places
- U.S. National Historic Landmark
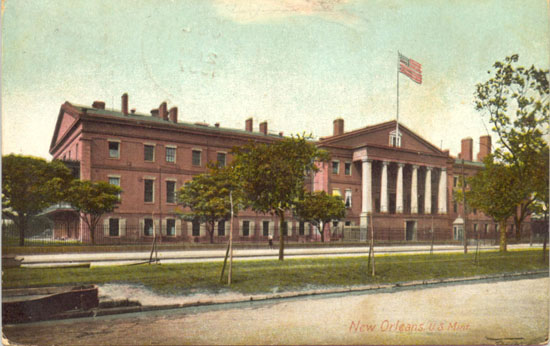
- A postcard dated July 12, 1907, showing the New Orleans Mint during its last few years of operation as a branch mint facility

- Location within East New Orleans Location within Louisiana Location within the United States
- Location: New Orleans, Louisiana, U.S.
- Coordinates: 29°57′41″N 90°3′28″W
- Built: 1835
- Architect: William Strickland
- Architectural style: Greek Revival
- NRHP reference No.: 73000875

Significant dates
- Added to NRHP: March 30, 1973
- Designated NHL: May 15, 1975

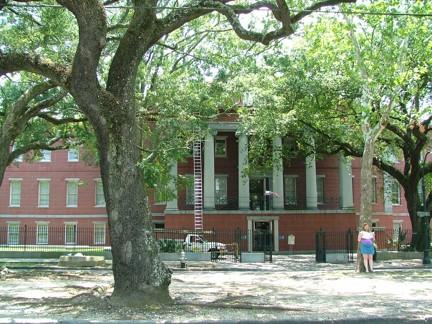
The Ionic-columned portico of the New Orleans Mint building's façade in June 2005, seen from across Esplanade Avenue. The trees along the street in front of the Mint have grown tall, such that it is very difficult to obtain a good photograph of the old mint's façade today.

The New Orleans Mint (French: Monnaie de La Nouvelle-Orléans) operated in New Orleans, Louisiana, as a branch mint of the United States Mint from 1838 to 1861 and from 1879 to 1909. During its years of operation, it produced over 427 million gold and silver coins of nearly every American denomination, with a total face value of over US$307 million. (Note: This refers to literally the face value of all the coins produced by the Mint added up. For example, the 720,000 3-cent pieces produced by the mint have a face value of US$0.03 x 720,000 = US$21,600.00. It does not reflect the value of coinage adjusted for inflation, nor does it account for the coins' numismatic value for collectors.) It was closed during most of the American Civil War and Reconstruction.

After it was decommissioned as a mint, the building has served a variety of purposes, including as an assay office, a United States Coast Guard storage facility, and a fallout shelter. Since 1981 it has served as a branch of the Louisiana State Museum. Damaged by Hurricane Katrina in 2005, after over two years of repairs and renovations, the museum reopened in October 2007. The New Orleans Mint has been designated a National Historic Landmark, and it is the oldest extant structure to have served as a U.S. Mint.

Along with the Charlotte Mint, it is one of two former mint facilities in the U.S. to house an art gallery. Exhibits include instruments used by some of New Orleans' notable jazz musicians, photographs, and posters, now part of the New Orleans Jazz Museum. The site is also a performance venue for jazz concerts, in partnership with the New Orleans Jazz National Historical Park and the private Music at the Mint organization.

The Louisiana Historical Center is located on the third floor of the building. The center includes collections of colonial-era manuscripts and maps, and primary and secondary source materials in a wide range of media. It is open to anyone with an interest in Louisiana history and culture.

== History ==
=== Antebellum period, 1835–1861 ===
==== Background ====
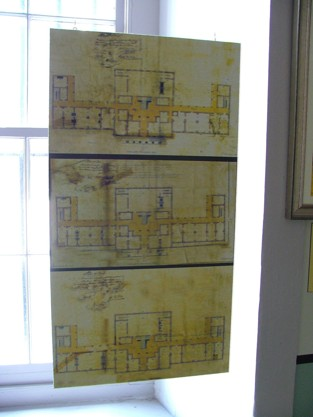
This photo from the Louisiana State Museum in the old U.S. Mint shows the original 1835 plans for the building by William Strickland. The Mint building retains this basic W-shaped design today.

The establishment of the New Orleans Mint was prompted by a complex fiscal crisis of the 1830s, which included a general shortage of domestically-minted coinage and the frequent circulation of foreign coins to alleviate the problem. In 1832 President Andrew Jackson had vetoed a rechartering of the Second Bank of the United States, an institution which he felt extended credit to northeastern commercial tycoons at the expense of the ordinary frontiersmen of the Old Southwest, a region with which Jackson, a Tennessean, strongly identified. In 1836 Jackson had issued an executive order called the Specie Circular which demanded that all land transactions in the United States be conducted in cash. Both of these actions, combined with the economic depression following the Panic of 1837 (caused partly by Jackson's fiscal policies) increased the domestic need for minted money.

As a result, in 1835 the U.S. Federal Government established three branch mints: the Charlotte Mint in North Carolina, the Dahlonega Mint in Georgia and the New Orleans Mint. Dahlonega and Charlotte were in gold mining regions and these mints produced only gold coins. New Orleans was selected because of the city's strategic location along the Mississippi River which made it a vitally important center for commercial activity, including the export of cotton from the area's plantations. Large quantities of gold from Mexico also passed through its port annually.

In the early 19th century, New Orleans, which was the fifth-largest city in the United States until the Civil War, (Note: Behind New York City, Baltimore, Boston and Philadelphia) conducted more foreign trade than any other city in the nation. It was also located relatively near to gold deposits recently discovered in Alabama. While the Philadelphia Mint produced a substantial quantity of coinage, in the early 19th century it could not disperse the money swiftly to the far regions of the new nation, particularly the South and West. In contrast to the other two Southern branch mints, which only minted gold coinage, the New Orleans Mint produced both gold and silver coins, and in much greater quantities and total value, which marked it as the most important branch mint in the country until the San Francisco Mint began minting a large monetary value of gold coins in the mid 1850s.

The Mint's location occupies a prominent place in civic history. It sits at one of the two River corners of the French Quarter, which had been the entire city, or Vieux Carré, of New Orleans. Under French and Spanish rule this location was home to one of the city's defensive fortifications. In 1792 the Spanish governor, Francisco Luis Héctor de Carondelet, erected Fort San Carlos (later Fort St. Charles) here. The fort was demolished in 1821; and the nearby area was later named Jackson Square in honor of Andrew Jackson. As a general in the United States Army, Jackson's leadership had saved the city from invading British forces during December 1814 and through January 8, 1815, the date of the famous Battle of New Orleans, the last significant battle of the War of 1812.

==== Architectural history ====
===== Design and construction =====
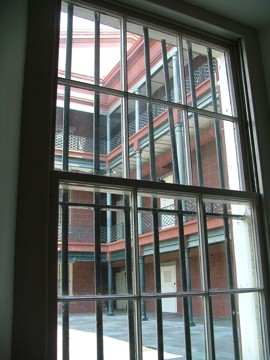
View through a window in the old U.S. Mint showing one of the rear courtyards

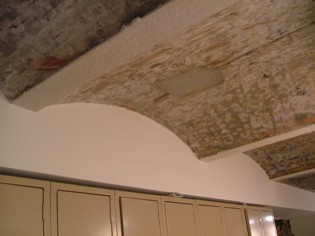
Shallow jack arches between steel I-beams provide the structural support for the floors of the Mint.

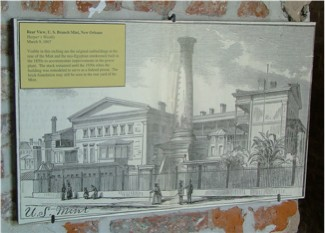
An illustration by Alfred R. Waud from Harper's Weekly in 1867 showing the smokestack built behind the New Orleans Mint. Remains of the smokestack's foundation can still be seen.

The Mint building, which was constructed in red brick, was designed by architect William Strickland in the Greek Revival style, like most 19th-century public buildings in the United States. Strickland was a student of the architect Benjamin Latrobe, a disciple of Neoclassicism who had helped design the United States Capitol building in Washington, D.C. Strickland himself, based in Philadelphia, had already designed the Philadelphia Mint building and the Second Bank of the United States, and would design the Charlotte and Dahlonega facilities, making him the architect of the first four U.S. mint buildings. Martin Gordon supervised the building's construction, which was undertaken by Benjamin F. Fox, the master carpenter and joiner, and John Mitchell, the master stonemason and builder.

On the north façade the mint building features a central projecting Ionic portico, supported by four monumental columns that are flanked at the ends by square pillars. The top of the portico contains a simple entablature, crowned by a flat roof in front of a simple, unadorned pediment. This entrance, which sits on top of a basement story, fronts the rectangular central core of the facility and is flanked by two large wings of multiple bays of rectangular windows. These wings wrap around the central rectangular core to form a W-shaped structure with two square courtyards at the rear. Balconies framed by iron railings and posts adorn the sections of the building's south façade that adjoin the courtyards. Architectural historian Talbot Hamlin described it thus: "it has those graceful, original proportions so characteristic of Strickland's work. Even today [1944], condemned to a use so different from that for which it was designed, it remains one of the most distinguished of the earlier buildings of New Orleans."

On the interior, Strickland placed the grand staircase that connects the three levels immediately behind the portico in the central core of the structure. The floor system is composed of fired-clay jack arches supported on steel I-beams, a common feature of warehouses and other long-span structures. On the second floor, many of the larger rooms, which were used for coining and melting, contain ceilings with beautiful high arches supported by the walls and freestanding piers. The smaller rectangular rooms on the second level (and the basement), such as the former superintendent's office, also contain these arched ceilings with a single groin vault. The basement formerly contained the boilers inside a brick cage, but now contain museum exhibits devoted to the minting processes as well as the Coin Vault at the Mint, a coin shop.

===== Structural problems and repairs =====
Strickland did not take into account the swampy lowland and high water table that characterizes the terrain around New Orleans, and so during its career the New Orleans Mint building has encountered numerous structural problems from the shifting soil beneath its foundation. In the 1840s the building was reinforced with iron rods inserted between the floors. In 1854, the federal government hired West Point engineering graduate (and Louisiana native) Pierre Gustave Toutant Beauregard to fireproof the building, rebuild the arches supporting the basement ceiling and install masonry flooring. Beauregard completed the work in conjunction with Captain Johnson K. Duncan by 1859. During this period, the Mint's heavy machinery was converted to steam power so a smokestack (since demolished) was built at the rear of the structure to carry away the fumes.

Less than two years later, Beauregard would rise to national fame as the Confederate general who ordered the April 1861 assault on Fort Sumter in Charleston harbor, South Carolina, thus beginning the American Civil War. It was during the war that Beauregard would secure his place in American history as one of the Confederacy's most capable generals.

==== Early coining operations ====
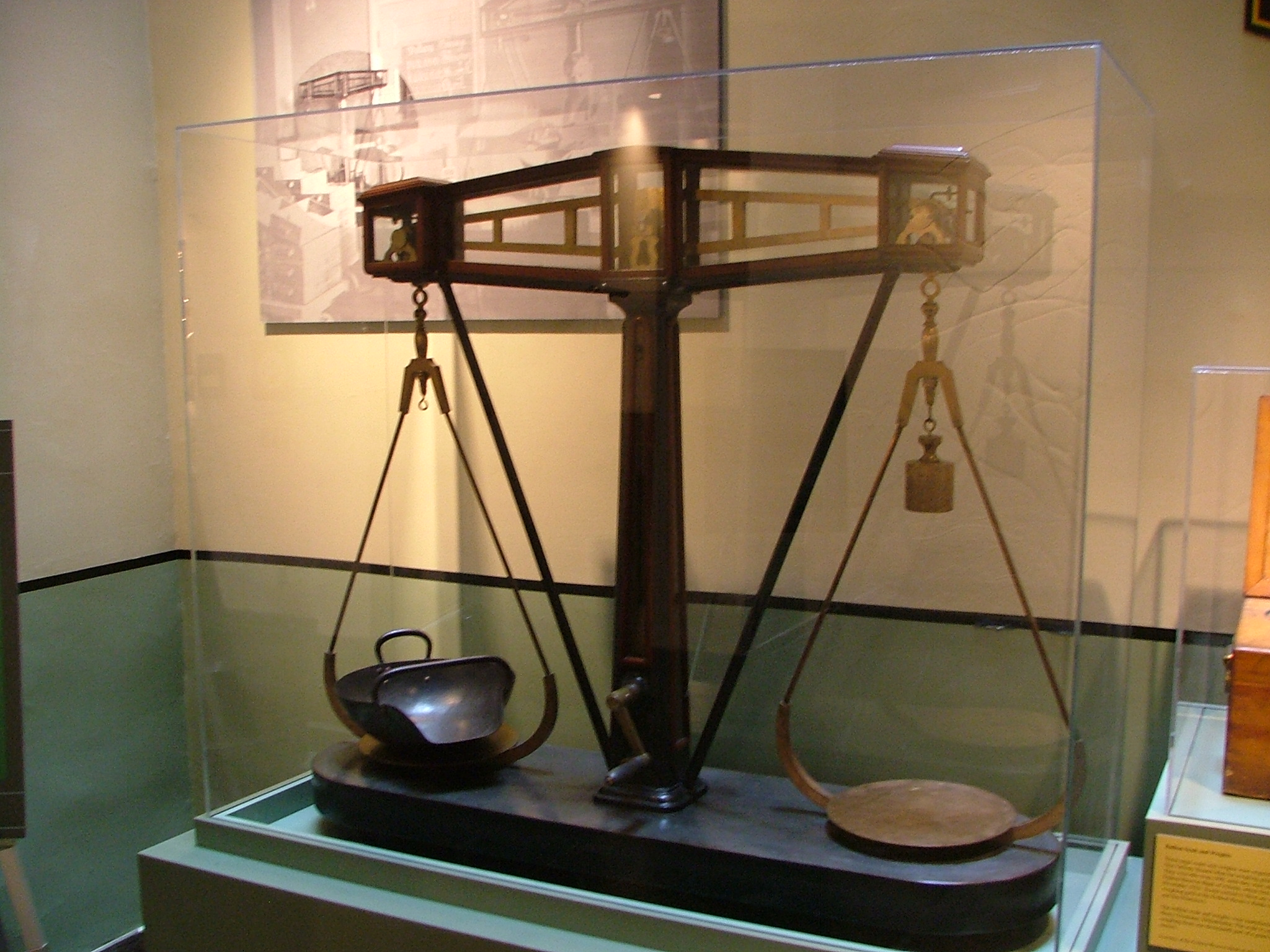
A scale for weighing coinage used at the New Orleans Mint in the 19th century

Like any other mint the New Orleans Mint was a factory to make coins. Operations at the New Orleans Mint began on March 8, 1838, with the deposit of the first Mexican gold bullion. The first coins, 30 dimes, were struck on May 7. Until it was taken over by the Confederacy in 1861 it produced many different denominations, all of which were either silver or gold: silver three-cent pieces (1851 only), half dimes, dimes, quarters, half dollars, silver dollars, gold dollars, $2.50 quarter eagles, three-dollar pieces, $5 half-eagles, $10 eagles, and $20 double eagles. (Note: Cents and copper-nickel five-cent pieces were never struck at the New Orleans mint. Preceding is a listing of the coinage produced by the New Orleans Mint, gathered from www.coinfacts.com. See also Lambousy 2003, p. 39)

Many interesting characters served at the Mint during the early years of operation. One was John Leonard Riddell, who served as melter and refiner at the Mint from 1839 to 1848, and, outside of his job, pursued interests in botany, medicine, chemistry, geology, and physics. He invented the binocular microscope. He also wrote on numismatics, publishing in 1845 a book entitled Monograph of the Silver Dollar, Good and Bad, Illustrated With Facsimile Figures, and two years later an article by him appeared in DeBow's Review called "The Mint at New Orleans—Processes Pursued of Working the Precious Metals—Statistics of Coinage, etc." Riddell was not held in high esteem by everyone, however: his conflicts with other Mint employees were well-documented, and at one point he was accused of being unable to properly conduct a gold melt.

Throughout the 19th century the New Orleans Mint was frequently featured in magazines, newspapers and other print publications. Articles discussing and images picturing the Mint, in addition to the one by Riddell noted above, were featured in Ballou's Pictorial Drawing-Room Companion, published in Boston, and the widely circulated Harper's Weekly.

=== Civil War and recommissioning, 1861–1879 ===
==== Secession and Confederate seizure ====
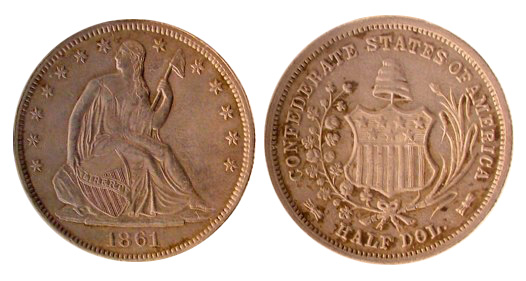
A Confederate half-dollar struck at New Orleans in 1861

The New Orleans Mint operated continuously from 1838 until January 26, 1861, when Louisiana seceded from the United States. On January 29, the Secession Convention reconvened at New Orleans (it had earlier met in Baton Rouge) and passed an ordinance that allowed Federal employees to remain in their posts, but as employees of the state of Louisiana. On February 5, 1861, during the proceedings of the Convention of the State of Louisiana in New Orleans, the committee appointed by the Convention to take an inventory on February 1, 1861, of public property in the hands of the officers of 'the late' Federal government reported that the Sub-Treasurer's vault at the mint contained $483,983 in gold and silver coins. The National Archives records in Rockville, Maryland, indicate the $483,983 consisted of $308,771 in gold coins and $175,212.08 in silver coins. The only gold coin produced in January 1861 was the $20 gold double-eagle. This means 15,438 $20 gold coins were minted by the New Orleans Mint during January 1861. Mint coinage records for the $20 1861-O gold double-eagle indicate only 5,000 $20 gold pieces were minted by the Federal Government in January 1861. This discrepancy is explained in a Numismatist Journal article.

In March 1861, Louisiana ratified the Constitution of the Confederate States and the Confederate government retained all the mint officers. They used it briefly as their own coinage facility. The Confederates struck 962,633 of the 2,532,633 New Orleans half-dollar coins dated 1861. Research suggests that 1861-O half dollars bearing a bisected date die crack ("WB-103") and 1861-O half-dollars with a "speared olive bud" anomaly ("WB-104") on the reverse had been minted under authority of the Confederacy. Confederate officials designed alternate reverse dies which they used to strike their own half-dollars in New Orleans (see image). The exact number of the half-dollar coins struck by the Confederate mint with the alternate reverse is unknown; but only four are known to exist today. One of them, which was sold at auction for a large sum, had once been owned by Jefferson Davis, the only President of the C.S.A.

Confederate minting operations continued from April 1 until the bullion ran out later that month. The staff remained on duty until May 31, 1861. After that the mint was used for quartering Confederate troops, until it was recaptured along with the rest of the city the following year, largely by Union naval forces under the command of Admiral David Farragut.

==== Occupation by Union forces ====
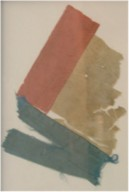
A piece of the U.S. flag William Mumford tore down from the New Orleans Mint in 1862

For many Southern sympathizers, the Mint soon became a symbol of their hatred for the Union occupation. After U.S. Marines under Farragut had raised the U.S. flag on the roof of the Mint in April 1862, a professional steamboat gambler named William Bruce Mumford ascended the roof and tore the flag down. He ripped the banner into shreds, and defiantly stuffed pieces of it into his shirt to wear as souvenirs. Union General Benjamin Franklin Butler, the military governor of New Orleans (who was soon to be derisively nicknamed "Spoons" for allegedly pocketing the silverware of New Orleans citizens) arrested Mumford for treason against the United States and ordered Mumford executed in retaliation. And so, Mumford was hanged from a flagstaff projecting horizontally from the building on June 7, 1862. Mumford's hanging made national headlines. Jefferson Davis demanded that Butler immediately be executed if captured. The event stuck in the minds of many New Orleanians: eleven years later, in 1873, a visitor to the city named Edward King mentioned it in his description of the structure.

The mint reopened as an assay office in 1876. Its machinery was evidently damaged during the war, but because of its importance, unlike the mints at Charlotte and Dahlonega, in 1877 U.S. Mint agent James R. Snowden asked the superintendent of the office, Maximilian F. Bonzano, to report on the condition of the facility for minting. Upon receipt of Bonzano's report, new minting equipment was shipped to New Orleans. The building was refurbished and put back into active minting service in 1879, producing mainly silver coinage, including the famed Morgan silver dollar from 1879 to 1904.

=== A second chance, 1879–1909 ===
==== New Orleans coinage ====
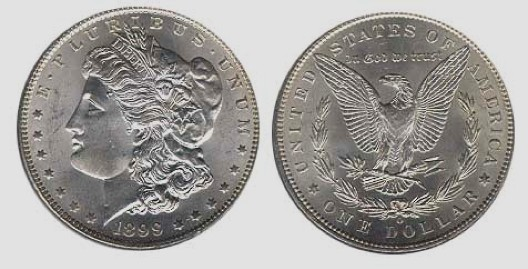
An 1899-O Morgan dollar. Some of the most famous American coins, today they are the most widely available of the types produced in New Orleans.

The refurbishment and recommissioning of the New Orleans Mint was due partly to the fact that in 1878 the Federal government in Washington, D.C. had passed the Bland–Allison Act, which mandated the purchase and coining of a large quantity of silver yearly. The Treasury Department needed additional facilities to do so. It reopened the New Orleans facility primarily to coin large quantities of silver dollars, most of which were simply stored in the building instead of circulated. President Rutherford B. Hayes appointed former Mississippi Senator and governor Henry S. Foote the new superintendent of the mint.

On July 3, 1885, President Cleveland appointed Gabriel Montegut, a native of New Orleans and resident of Terrebonne Parish to head the Mint. He replaced Dr. Andrew Woods Smythe as Superintendent who served less than one year. Until Montegut's appointment, the superintendents had largely been political appointments without banking experience. Through his family, Montegut had been involved in the banking and economic development of communities, including those in Terrebonne Parish. He served until 1889.

During this second period of operation, the Mint also struck dimes, quarters, half dollars, $5 half eagles, $10 eagles and, in 1879 only, 2,325 double eagles. It should also be noted that the New Orleans Mint was used by the Federal authorities in 1907 to coin over five and a half million silver twenty-centavo pieces for the Mexican government as part of the American government's program of producing foreign coinage. These coins can be distinguished by a "curved" numeral 7 on the coin.

The New Orleans Mint, whose coins can be identified by the "O" mint mark found on the reverse of its coinage, earned a reputation for producing coins of mediocre quality; their luster was usually not as brilliant as those of other mints, and center areas tended to be flattened and not sharply struck. Thus, New Orleanian coinage is prized in the numismatic world today.

==== Social history ====
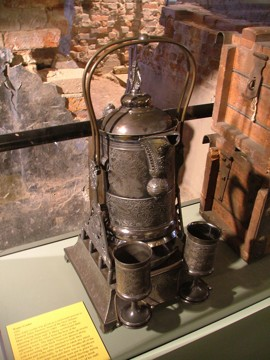
A water cooler given as a gift to the head of the coining department at the New Orleans Mint in 1891 by his staff

Men made up the majority of the workers at the mint. They worked such jobs as coiners, melters, pressers, cutters, and rollers. The mint was overseen by a superintendent, who was always male. He was a political appointee whose term usually did not last much longer than the party which held the presidency remained in power.

But it was also during the mint's second tour of duty that women began to find work at the New Orleans Mint. Several women workers were sent from the Philadelphia Mint to teach those in New Orleans how to adjust money. About this time, the mint employed forty-four women. Thirty-nine worked as adjusters — employees who weighed the unstamped coin planchets to make sure they were the proper weight before coining. These women would sit at long narrow tables, filing the planchets down to the proper weight, wearing special aprons with pouches attached to the sleeves and the waist to catch the excess dust. Five women served as counters and packers before the coins were shipped to Washington, D.C. Some women were eventually employed at the coining presses.

The women worked from 8:30 a.m. to 3:30 p.m. daily — not long hours — but the working conditions were probably unbearable by modern standards. New Orleans has a warm, wet climate. The process of adjusting, however, required the utmost attention to the scales' balance, and the slightest draft could upset it. The draft could also carry off the silver dust from the coin planchets the women would file. For these reasons the windows and doors were almost always kept shut, resulting in a very hot working environment. Workers relied on water coolers to provide relief from the heat and avoid dehydration. The women mint employees were judged to enjoy better working conditions than many other American women workers in the late nineteenth century.

=== The mint in the 20th and 21st centuries ===
==== Closure ====
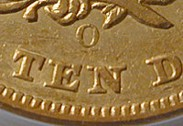
A close-up of the "O" mint mark on a New Orleans $10 gold piece

By the early twentieth century, the U.S. Treasury had mints operating in New Orleans, Denver, San Francisco, and the main center in Philadelphia, which more than met the demand for minted money. In 1904, the government ceased the minting of the silver dollar, which accounted for the bulk of the coinage the New Orleans branch had been producing since 1879. In 1909 Treasury officials declined to appropriate funds for the mint's operation, effectively halting subsequent minting activity in New Orleans. In 1911, the New Orleans Mint was formally decommissioned and the machinery was transferred to the main U. S. Mint facility in Philadelphia.

Twenty years later, in 1930, Governor Huey Long would rail against this loss when he ran for the office of U.S. Senator against incumbent Joseph E. Ransdell. In a circular distributed by his campaign to the citizens of New Orleans, Long listed the loss of the Mint as the very first of many complaints against Ransdell's lengthy service record in the Senate. Long went on to win the election, although he did not take office until his term as governor expired in 1932. At some point, however, the original New Orleans machinery was lost, and, at present, has not been located.

==== Transformation ====
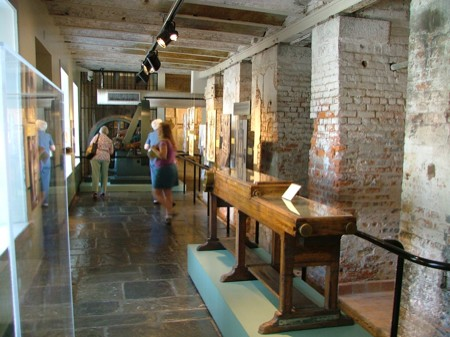
The basement of the old U.S. Mint contains artifacts and photographs from the era 1838–1909, and is the part of the museum devoted exclusively to the building's function in that capacity.

After the mint closed, it performed a variety of functions for the Federal government. It was first downgraded to an assay office for the U.S. Treasury as it had been from 1876 to 1879. Then, in 1932, the assay office closed and the building was converted into a Federal prison, in which capacity it served until 1943. The Coast Guard then took over the building as a nominal storage facility, though in truth the structure was largely abandoned and left to decay until it was transferred to the state of Louisiana in 1965. During the Cold War, when many believed there to be a high risk of nuclear war, the old Mint was considered to be the best fallout shelter in the city.

The state agreed to save the structure from demolition on the condition that it be renovated and converted to some new purpose within fifteen years. Between 1978 and 1980 this goal was met. Since 1981, the Mint building has functioned as a museum of its coin production history. Additional exhibitions housed in the facility have been devoted to New Orleans Mardi Gras (since moved to the Presbytere building on Jackson Square), jazz music (a large exhibit and research materials previously in the New Orleans Jazz Museum – donated by the N.O. Jazz Club), and Newcomb Pottery. All three phenomena have contributed to New Orleans' fame.

On the third floor, the Mint houses an archive of maps and documents, including French and Spanish colonial records. Along with the Cabildo, the Presbytere, the 1850 House, and Madame John's Legacy, this facility is one of five branches of the Louisiana State Museum in the French Quarter.

The Mint building is located at 400 Esplanade Avenue, not far from the Mississippi River.

==== Katrina aftermath ====
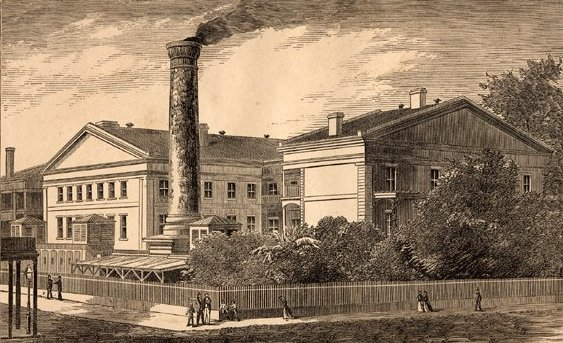
United States Mint building, New Orleans, Louisiana in 1873

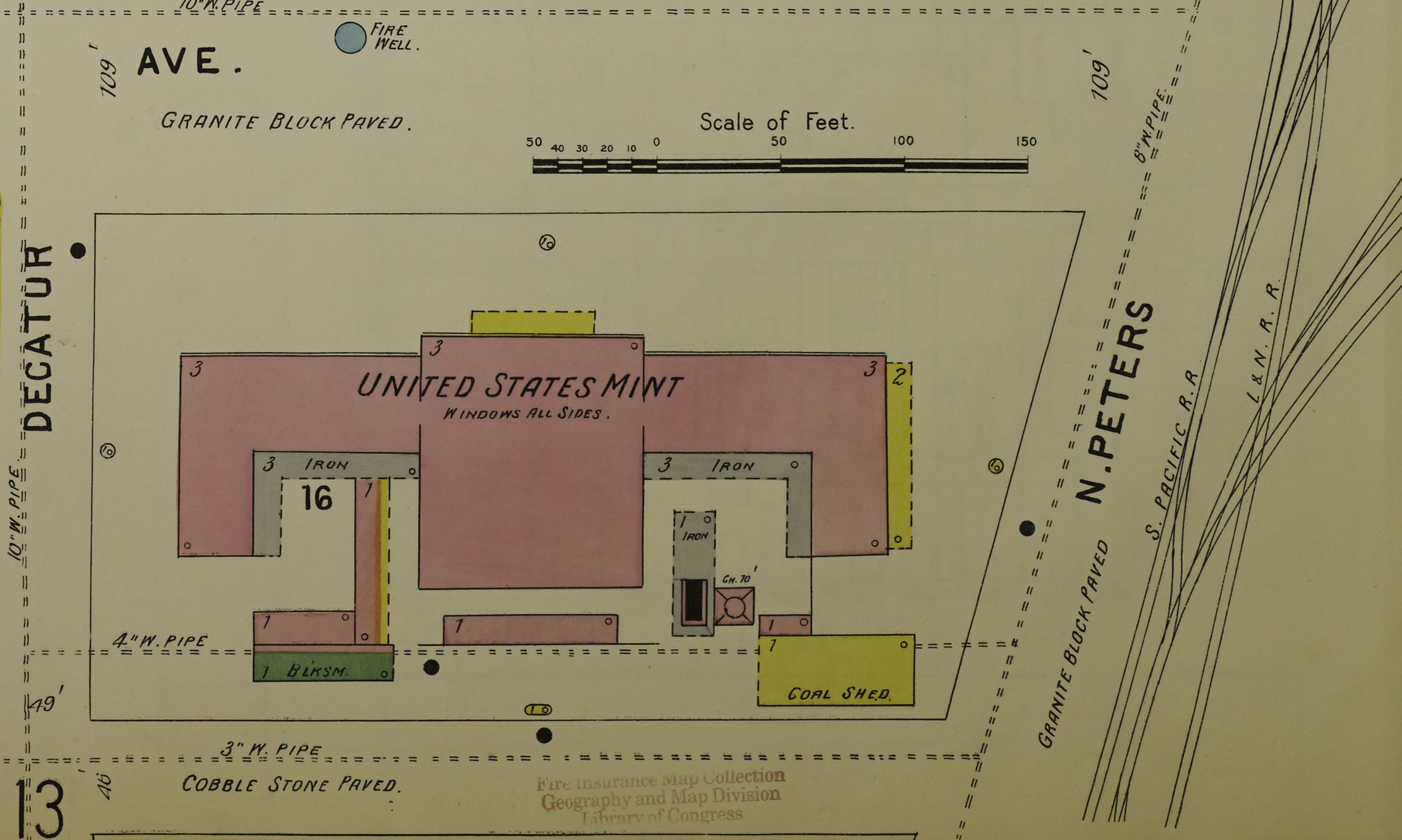
"UNITED STATES MINT" 1895 map detail, Sanborn Fire Insurance Map from New Orleans

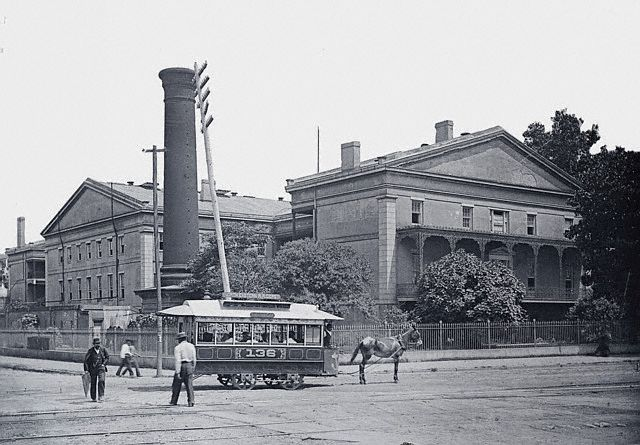
Horse-drawn trams in New Orleans about 1890

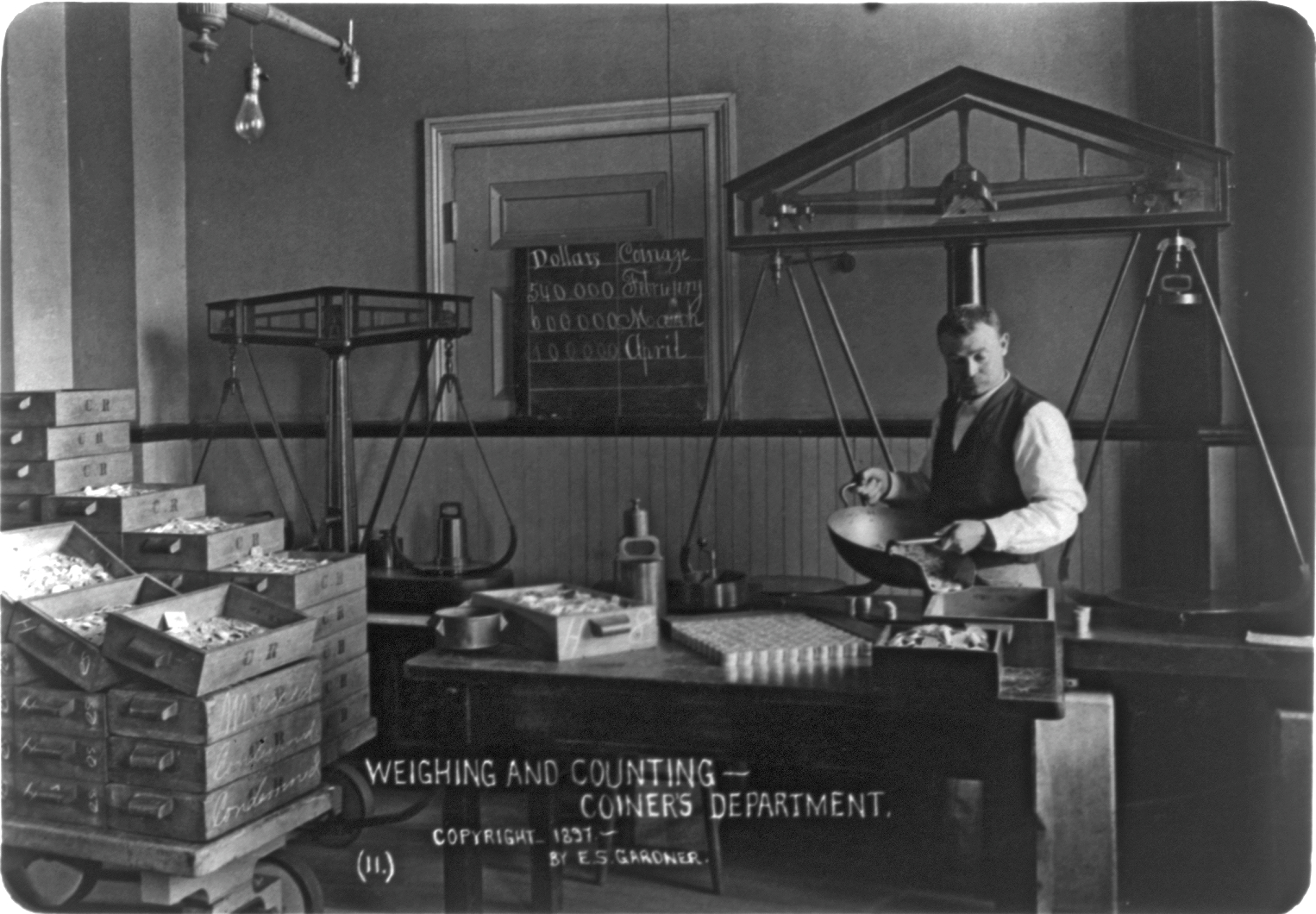
Newly minted 1897 Morgan Dollars being Weighed and Counted in the Coiner's Department, United States Mint of New Orleans

The mint building suffered significant roof damage from the hurricane. Water entered the building and came into contact with approximately 3% of the New Orleans Jazz collection, portions of which were removed and cared for at Louisiana State University, the University of Louisiana at Lafayette, and the Louisiana State Archives.

== Coinage produced ==
=== Silver coins ===
| Coin type | Series | Years minted | Image | Notes |
|---|---|---|---|---|
| Three-cent pieces | Silver three-cent | 1851 | | The "O" mint mark is to the right of the Roman numeral "III" on the reverse. This was the only year three-cent pieces were struck by a branch mint. This also marks the smallest denomination silver coin minted by any branch mint. |
| Half dimes | Seated Liberty | 1838–1842, 1844, 1848–1860 | | The 1853-1855 coins were minted in two varieties: one with arrows at the date, and one without them. The arrows indicated a slight reduction in weight. |
| Dimes | Seated Liberty | 1838–1843, 1845, 1849–1860, 1891 | | The mint mark is located in the wreath. The Seated Liberty dime of 1838 is said to be the first silver coin minted in New Orleans. Arrows also appear around the date for some of the 1853 and all of the 1854-55 issues. |
| Dimes | Barber | 1892–1903, 1905–1909 | | Note the mint mark on the reverse below the wreath. The 1895-O is considered the "key" issue of the Barber dime series. |
| Quarters | Seated Liberty | 1840–1844, 1847, 1849–1860, 1891 | | Arrows appear in some of the 1853 and all of the 1854-55 issues. |
| Quarters | Barber | 1892–1909 | | The Barber quarter was minted in New Orleans, with the mint mark below the eagle on the reverse, until the mint closed in 1909. |
| Half dollars | Capped Bust | 1838–39 | | The two years that this coin was minted in New Orleans marked the first time in American numismatic history that mint marks appeared on the obverse. After 1840, mint marks would generally be found on the reverse, with the exception of the Lincoln Cents beginning in 1909. Coins dated 1838 are exceedingly rare. Coins dated 1839 are somewhat more accessible. |
| Half dollars | Seated Liberty | 1840–1861 | | Some of the 1853 issues have both arrows at the date and rays on the reverse. The 1854-55 have just arrows. Coins minted on January 25, 1861, would be the last silver coins minted by the US Government in New Orleans until 1879. Coins minted on the 26th were silver coins minted by the State of Louisiana. Thus, the Seated Liberty Half Dollar would be the last US silver coin minted here until 1879. |
| Half dollars | Barber | 1892–1909 | | The first year of issue, the 1892-O, is generally considered the "key" issue of this series, although it remains readily available in lower grades. Until the mint closed half dollars were minted most following years. |
| Dollars | Seated Liberty | 1846, 1850, 1859–60 | | |
| Dollars | Morgan | 1879–1904 | | The most common coin produced by the New Orleans Mint. |

=== Gold coins ===
| Coin type | Series | Years minted | Image | Notes |
|---|---|---|---|---|
| Dollars | Liberty Head | 1849–1853 | | The 1849 issues were only struck with an open wreath on the reverse. |
| Dollars | Indian Princess | 1855 | Upload image | |
| Quarter eagles ($2.50) | Classic head | 1839 | Upload image | |
| Quarter eagles ($2.50) | Liberty head | 1840, 1842–43, 1845–1847, 1850–1852, 1854, 1856–57 | | This example shows the mint mark merging with the arrow feathers below the eagle, a common occurrence on nineteenth century U.S. coins. |
| Three dollars | Indian head | 1854 | Upload image | This was the only year in which three-dollar gold pieces were struck in New Orleans. |
| Half eagles ($5) | Liberty head | 1840–1847, 1851, 1854–1857, 1892–1894 | | |
| Half eagles ($5) | Indian head | 1909 | Upload image | These coins were incused when minted; that is, the die pattern was pressed into the planchet. |
| Eagles ($10) | Liberty head | 1841–1860, 1879–1883, 1888, 1892–1895, 1897, 1899, 1901, 1903–04, 1906 | | The banner above the eagle with the motto "In God We Trust" was added to $10 gold pieces in 1866. 1894 saw one of the highest mintage totals for eagles at the New Orleans Mint. |
| Double eagles ($20) | Liberty head | 1850–1861, 1879 | | The largest denomination of circulating coinage issued by the U.S. Mint. |

== See also ==
- List of Mints
- Historical United States mints
- Charlotte Mint
- Dahlonega Mint
- Denver Mint
- Philadelphia Mint
- List of National Historic Landmarks in Louisiana
- National Register of Historic Places listings in Orleans Parish, Louisiana

== Bibliography ==
- Bailey, Thomas; Kennedy, David; Cohen, Lizabeth (1998). The American Pageant: A History of the Republic (11th ed.). Boston and New York: Houghton Mifflin.
- Bowers, Q. David (2004). The Official Red Book of Morgan Silver Dollars: A Complete History and Price Guide. Atlanta: Whitman Publishing.
- Evans, George Greenlief (1894) [1885]. Illustrated History of the United States Mint (new revised ed.). Philadelphia: G. G. Evans.
- Irwin, David. Neoclassicism. London, UK: Phaidon, 1997.
- Lange, David (2005). A History of the United States Mint and Its Coinage. Atlanta: Whitman. ISBN 079481972-9. OL 7842492M.
- Taxay, Don. The United States Mint and Coinage: An Illustrated History from 1776 to the Present. New York: Arco, 1966.
- The Old U.S. Mint: A Historic Property of the Louisiana State Museum (Brochure). New Orleans: Louisiana State Museum. 2005.
- [Various exhibit placards]. Old U.S. Mint, Louisiana State Museum, New Orleans. Accessed June 22, 2005.
- Williams, Harry T. (1981) [1969]. Huey Long (Reprint, Vintage ed.). New York: Knopf.
- Wiley, Randy; Bugert, Bill (1993). The Complete Guide to Liberty Seated Half Dollars. DLRC Press. ISBN 9994368141.
- Yeoman, R.S. (2014). Bressett, Kenneth (ed.). A Guide Book of United States Coins 2015 (68th ed.). Atlanta, Georgia: Whitman Publishing. ISBN 978-079484215-4. OCLC 875521690. OL 28306197M.
