= Classic Head quarter eagle =

American gold coin

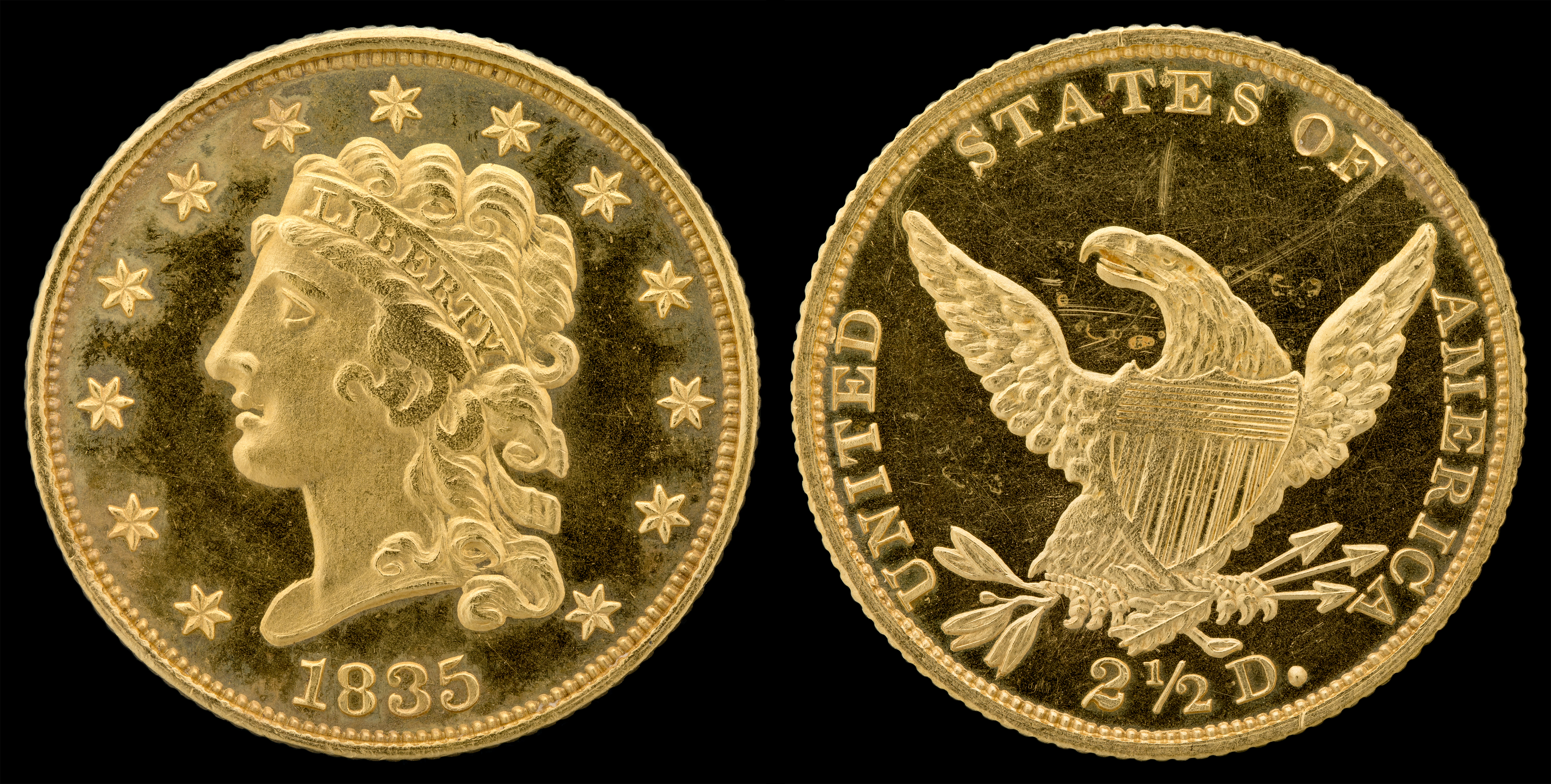
The 1835 Classic Head $2.50

The Classic Head $2.50 gold coin is an American coin, also called a quarter eagle, minted from 1834 to 1839. It features Liberty on the obverse and an eagle on the reverse.

== Economic conditions ==
The year 1834 witnessed tough economic times in the United States. President Andrew Jackson was opposed to the developing central bank of that era known as the Second Bank of the United States. His aim was to reform a system which took power away from the states and concentrated it in the hands of a few. He recognized the potential for abuse and manipulation that was not necessarily in the best interests of the United States. His attacks on the fledgling central bank served to erode their power despite the fact that their charter did not expire until 1836. This allowed the president to introduce banking reform which was officially passed by Congress in 1836. It was known as the Deposit Act.

In 1834, President Jackson began action to strengthen the U.S. economy. His goal was to retire the notes of the Bank of the United States prevalent in society at that time and to replace them with specie gold. In addition, he realized that the ratio between gold and silver must be adjusted if gold specie was to remain in circulation. At that time, the gold to silver ratio was 15:1 while in Europe, the ratio was 15.5:1. This led to the practice of melting down contemporary U.S. gold coins for profit because there was a slightly higher gold content than the face value. This practice led to significant coin rarities in the Capped Bust series of gold coins minted from 1808 to 1834. Gold specie fineness was reduced from .9167 fine to .8992 fine and the gold to silver ratio was increased to 16:1. This action was extremely astute and ensured that the new $2.50 and $5 coins would remain in circulation. These were the first widely circulated gold coins in US history.

== Design ==
The new quarter eagle also saw a reduction in diameter from 20 millimeters to 18.2 millimeters and a reduction in weight from 4.37 grams to 4.18 grams. The new issue was designed by William Kneass and minted in Philadelphia, Charlotte (1838–39), New Orleans (1839 only), and Dahlonega (1839 only).

The original 1834 dated Classic Head $2.50 gold coins come in two different varieties: the "Small Head” and the “Booby Head.”

== Collecting ==
About uncirculated (AU) and mint state specimens may exhibit proof-like or semi proof-like surfaces. In general, a semi proof-like surface is somewhat reflective around the devices and the edge of the coin as well as around the portrait. Coins that have not been cleaned generally show an original patina manifested with various golden, orange colors and a thick "skin". Advanced collectors seek such specimens as opposed to cleaned, shiny examples.

This series is highly collectible and are relatively easy to obtain and inexpensive for an early gold U.S. coin. The astute collector/investor will seek original, problem-free examples and avoid damaged and inferior coins, regardless of the grade. It is also wise to pursue coins authenticated and graded by a leading third party grading service such as Numismatic Guaranty Corporation (NGC) or Professional Coin Grading Service (PCGS).

== See also ==
- Classic Head
