= Quarter eagle =

Gold $2.50 coin of the United States

- United States
- Value: 2.50 US dollars
- Mass: 4.37 g (1796–1834); 4.18 g (1834–1929)
- Diameter: 20.6 mm (1796–1808); 18.5 mm (1821–1827); 18.2 mm (1829–1839); 18 mm (1840–1929)
- Edge: reeded
- Composition: 91.67% gold, 8.33% silver and copper (1796–1834); 89.92% gold, 10.08% silver and copper (1834–1836); 90% gold, 10% copper (1837–1929)
- Years of minting: 1796–1798, 1802, 1804–1808, 1821, 1824–1827, 1829–1915, 1925–1929

Obverse
- Design: Liberty wearing a cap
- Designer: Robert Scot
- Design date: 1796

Reverse
- Design: Heraldic eagle, based on the Great Seal of the United States
- Designer: Robert Scot
- Design date: 1796–1807

The quarter eagle was a two-dollar and fifty-cent gold coin that was minted by the United States Mint between 1796 and 1929. It was given its name in the Coinage Act of 1792, due to its worth being one-forth of a ten-dollar eagle coin.

== Early mintage (1796–1808) ==
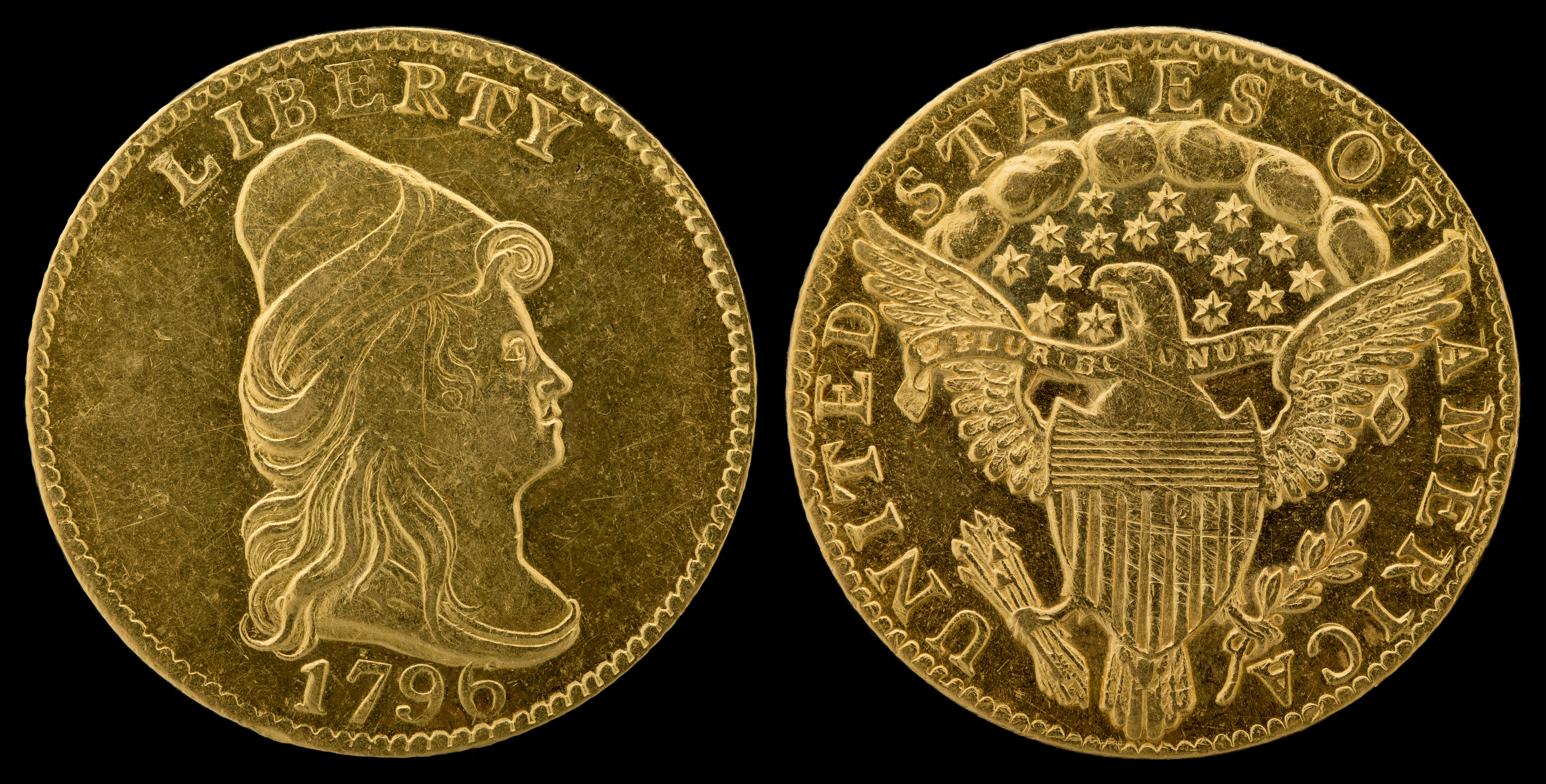
1796 "Turban Head" or "Capped Bust" quarter eagle (no stars)

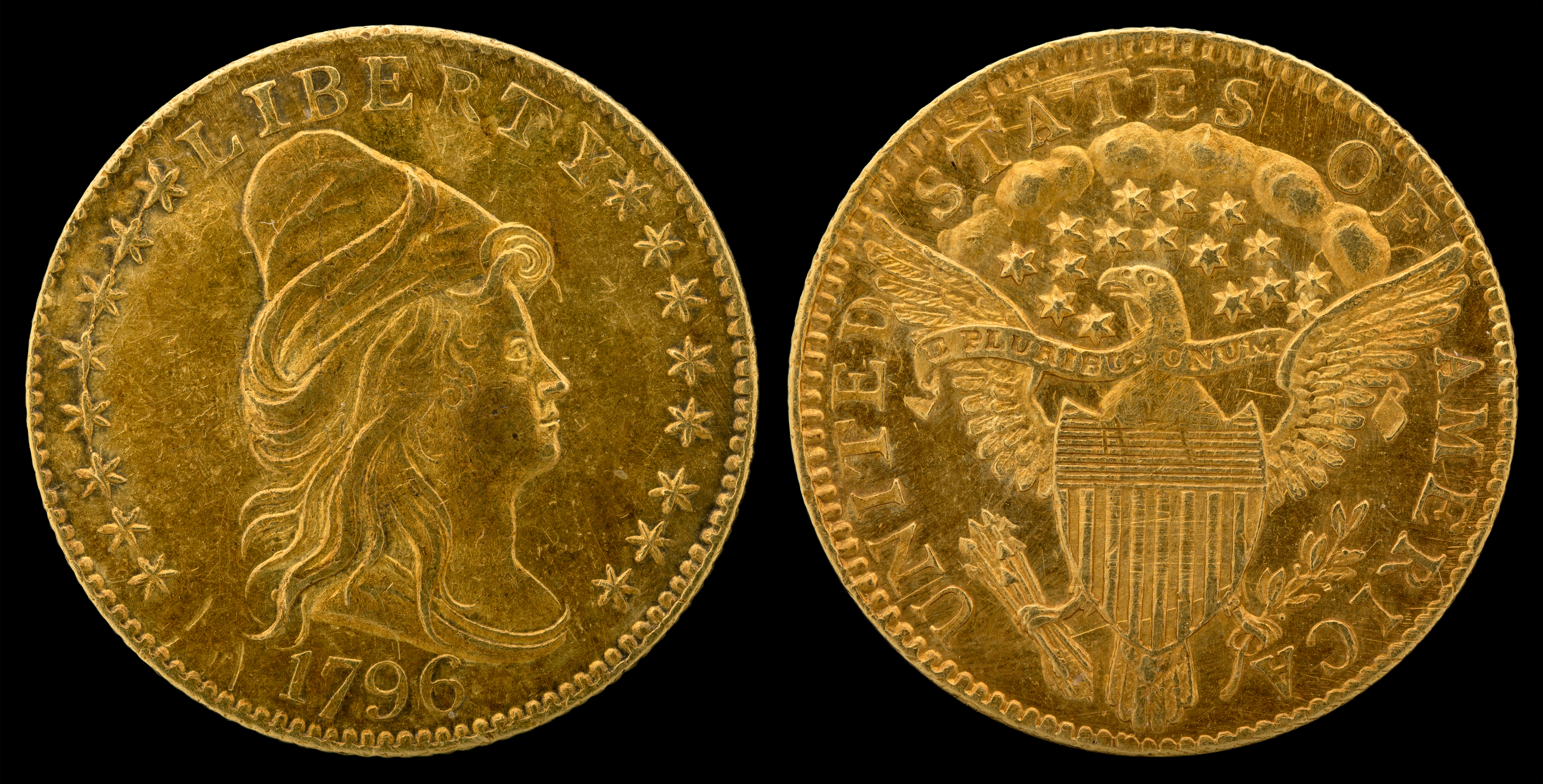
1796 "Turban Head" or "Capped Bust" quarter eagle (with stars)

The Coinage Act of 1792 established the United States Mint and a decimal monetary system, which included a quarter eagle, worth $2.50, denominated at one-fourth of an eagle. The law specified that the coin was to weigh 67.5 grains (4.37 g) and contain .916⅔ gold mixed with copper. The Philadelphia Mint could not begin striking gold coins until 1795, as the chief coiner and assayer each had to pay a $10,000 surety bond required by law, which neither could afford. An act of Congress in 1794 lowered the bond requirement to $5,000 for the chief coiner and $1,000 for the assayer. Striking of gold coinage began in 1795 with the half eagle and eagle, though the first quarter eagles were struck in 1796.

Dies for the quarter eagle were likely prepared by chief engraver Robert Scot in 1796, as there are no surviving records mentioning the designer. It is possible that another engraver employed during 1796, John Smith Gardner, designed the reverse of the coin. The obverse design was copied from that of the 1795 gold coinage, which depict Liberty facing right wearing a liberty cap, with the word LIBERTY above; this design is referred to as the Capped Bust to Right, though it is sometimes called the Turban Head as due to the cap being mistaken for a turban. The reverse depicts a heraldic eagle based on the Great Seal of the United States with the words UNITED STATES OF AMERICA. Unusually, the first 1796 quarter eagles did not have stars on the obverse, with no reason being known. Later 1796 issues had 16 stars, which was reduced to 13 in 1798. Subsequent issues with this design placed the stars in various configurations. The issues quarter eagle from 1796 to 1808 were defined 13/16 inch (20.6 mm) in diameter.

The Mint allowed anyone to deposit their bullion to convert into coin at the time. In comparison to half eagles and eagles, few quarter eagles were struck initially, as gold depositors requested coins in larger denominations. Numismatic historian Walter Breen questions why any quarter eagles were struck at all during their first decade, stating that only a few banks ordered them "on a whim" and most of the coins sat in vaults. While the 1796 "no stars" quarter eagle likely saw some circulation, many quarter eagles, as with other gold coinage struck by the Mint, were often exported and melted for profit.

Quarter eagles were struck with the Capped Bust to Right design until 1799, with the 1799 issues dated 1798. Early on, the Mint would continue to out-dated dies if they were usable. Plans for coinage in 1801 did not occur, with quarter eagle production resuming in 1802 and continuing with Scot's design until 1807, with issues in 1803 dated 1802. In 1807, John Reich was hired by Mint director Robert Patterson to provide new designs for all denominations of coinage. Adapting from his own 1807 half dollar design, Reich's obverse for the quarter eagle depicted Liberty facing left, while his reverse depicted an eagle with outstretched wings, with the denomination 2½ D below and a scroll bearing the motto E PLURIBUS UNUM above. The design has been referred to as the Capped Bust to Left, the Draped Bust to Left,, and the Capped Bust. The Capped Bust to Left quarter eagle was only struck in 1808, after which production of quarter eagles ended. When the War of 1812 broke out, large quantities of gold coinage was exported. After 1813, gold coins had effectively disappeared from circulation.

== Coinage resumes (1821–1839) ==
Mintage of the quarter eagle resumed in 1821, after banks requested their bullion deposits in the denomination. Scot adapted a modified version of Reich's Capped Bust, described as the Capped Head design. The portrait of Liberty was reduced, the 13 stars were placed circling the portrait, and the diameter of the modified coin was 18.5 mm. After 1821, this variety was struck from 1824 to 1827. A die for the 1821 quarter eagle was used to strike the 1824 quarter eagles, with the 1 modified into a 4.

After Scot's death in 1823, William Kneass was hired as the Mint chief engraver. Kneass was assigned to improve the current designs of coinage and a modified Capped Head quarter eagle began to be struck in 1829. New machinery acquired by the Mint in 1829 allowed coins to be struck with consistent diameters. This produced a raised rim with a beaded border. Previously, diameters varied due to inconsistencies in the minting process, and edge ornamentation was applied before the coin was struck. The diameter of the quarter eagle was reduced again to 18.2 mm.

Mintage of the Capped Head quarter eagle remained low through 1834. Most of the mintage of Capped Head quarter eagles went to bullion dealers who exported them for melting, as the price of gold in the coins was worth more than their face value. Around 25,000 Capped Head quarter eagles were struck between 1829 and 1834, yet due to melting, only 400 or 500 exist today. Due to costing more than face value to produce, quarter eagles did not circulate after 1820. In 1834, the gold bullion in a Capped Head quarter eagle was worth $2.66. This was taken advantage of by members of Congress, such as Senator Thomas Hart Benton, who could receive their salary in coins, as they would profit from transactions where traders valued the coins at their gold content rather than their face value.

=== Coinage Act of 1834 ===
Rising gold prices threatened gold coinage, as melting existing gold coins had become rampant. By 1834, gold coins did not circulate as they were being hoarded or melted. In response, Congress passed the Coinage Act of 1834 on June 28, 1834, which changed the weights and composition of gold coinage, going into effect on August 1. For the quarter eagle, its weight was reduced from 67.5 grains (4.37 g) to 64.5 grains (4.18 g), and its composition was reduced from 91.67% gold to 89.92% gold. Anticipating that gold coins would be brought to the Mint for recoinage, Mint director Samuel Moore ordered Kneass to prepare new dies omitting the motto E PLURIBUS UNUM so they could be easily identified with the new specifications. Secretary of the Treasury Levi Woodbury had suggested that the date August 1, 1834, be inscribed on the new coins to identify them. In a letter to Woodbury, Moore opposed including the date and recommended removing the motto instead as it had "no authority in law or good taste" and that it had "long been felt as an encumbrance." Private gold coinage struck by Christopher Bechtler followed Woodbury's suggestion and included the date.

Kneass redesigned the obverse of the quarter eagle, dubbed the Classic Head quarter eagle. The redesign depicted Liberty with flowing hair and a ribbon headband reading LIBERTY. The reverse remained the same except with the motto E PLURIBUS UNUM removed. The obverse portrait would continue to receive slight redesigns through 1839.

During the rest of the 1830s, there was a surge in quarter eagle mintage due to deposits from bullion dealers, the Mint melting unreleased gold coinage, and a shipment of gold from France. From 1834 to 1836, the Mint struck over 15 times more Classic Head quarter eagles than the total of all preexisting quarter eagle coinage from 1796–1834, with 968,228 struck between 1834 and 1839. In 1837, the composition was changed slightly to 90% gold. The Mint began to strike quarter eagles at other branch mints, beginning with the Charlotte Mint in 1838 and the Dahlonega Mint and New Orleans Mint in 1839. The coins struck at these mints would bear the mint marks C for Charlotte, O for New Orleans, and D for Dahlonega. The mint marks would be placed above the date on the obverse. Classic Head quarter eagles saw circulation until the twentieth century, except between 1862 and 1878 due to economic policies and the American Civil War.

== Liberty Head design (1840–1907) ==
After Kneass became incapacitated a stroke in 1835, Christian Gobrecht was hired as an engraver. Gobrecht and Kneass experimented with designs on all coin denominations, with Gobrecht adopting a new design for the eagle that was adapted onto half eagles in 1839 and quarter eagles in 1840. The obverse design depicted a new smaller head of Liberty, with braided hair in a bun, while the reverse design depicted an eagle similar to the previous design, but with accurate proportions to an actual eagle. Breen suggests that the reverse design might have been revised by Robert Ball Hughes. The mint mark was moved to the reverse, placed under the eagle. The design is referred to as the Liberty Head design, though it is also known as the Coronet design. The diameter was reduced to 18 mm, which would remain the diameter for quarter eagles until minting ended in 1929.

=== 1848 "CAL" Liberty Head quarter eagle ===
One notable date is 1848, when 230 ounces of gold were sent to the Secretary of War Marcy by Colonel R.B. Mason, the military governor of California. The gold was turned over to the mint and promptly made into quarter eagles. The distinguishing mark CAL. was punched above the heraldic eagle on the reverse side of the coin. Only 1,389 of these coins were minted and are highly sought after by collectors. There are several specimens with proof-like surfaces and the coins are highly sought after by collectors, with one example selling for $402,500 at auction in 2006.

== History ==
The quarter eagle denomination was struck at the main mint at Philadelphia (1796–1929), and branch mints in Charlotte (1838–1860), New Orleans (1839–1857 only), Dahlonega (1839–1859), San Francisco (1854–1879), and Denver (1911–1925). Years were skipped at the various mints, with no coins at all made from 1809–1820 and 1916–1924. The first issues weighed 67.5 grains (0.154 oz; 4.37 g) at .9167 fineness. This was modified to 64.5 grains (0.147 oz; 4.18 g) and at .8992 fineness by the Coinage Act of 1834. The soon-to-follow Coinage Act of 1837 established a fineness of .900, meaning that 1837 and later quarter eagles contain 0.121 troy ounces (0.133 oz; 3.8 g) of gold content.

Relatively few coins were struck prior to 1834, owing to their higher gold content (promoting melting for their bullion content). The first issues were struck in 1796. The quarter eagle denomination was officially discontinued in 1933 with the removal of the United States from the Gold Standard, although the last date of issue was 1929.

On February 10, 2026, the United States House of Representatives unanimously passed a bill introduced by Rep. Robert Aderholt that would require the United States mint to restart production of $2.50 denominated coins in honor of the 250th anniversary of the United States of America.

== List of design varieties ==
Quarter eagle Capped Busts
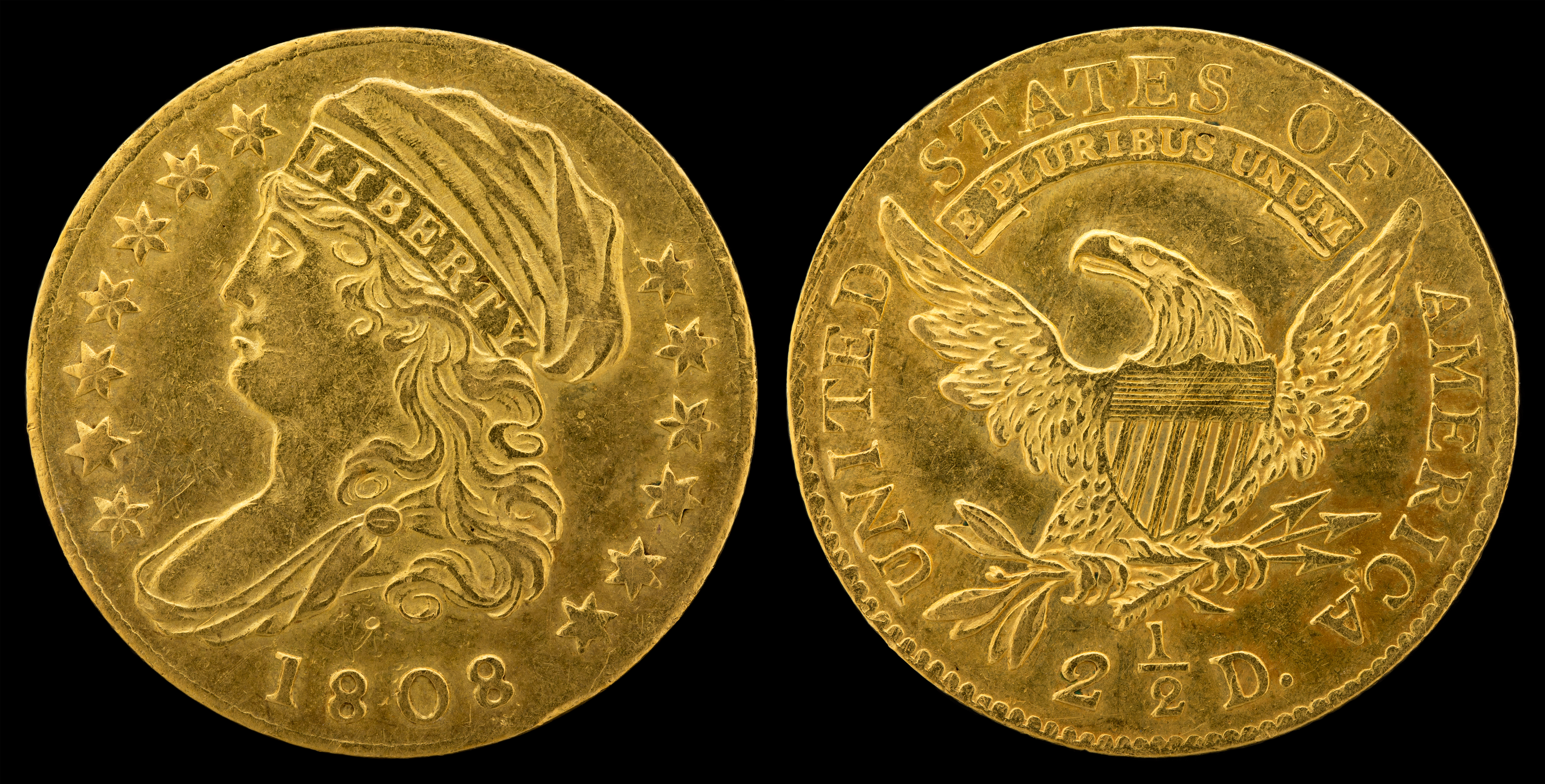
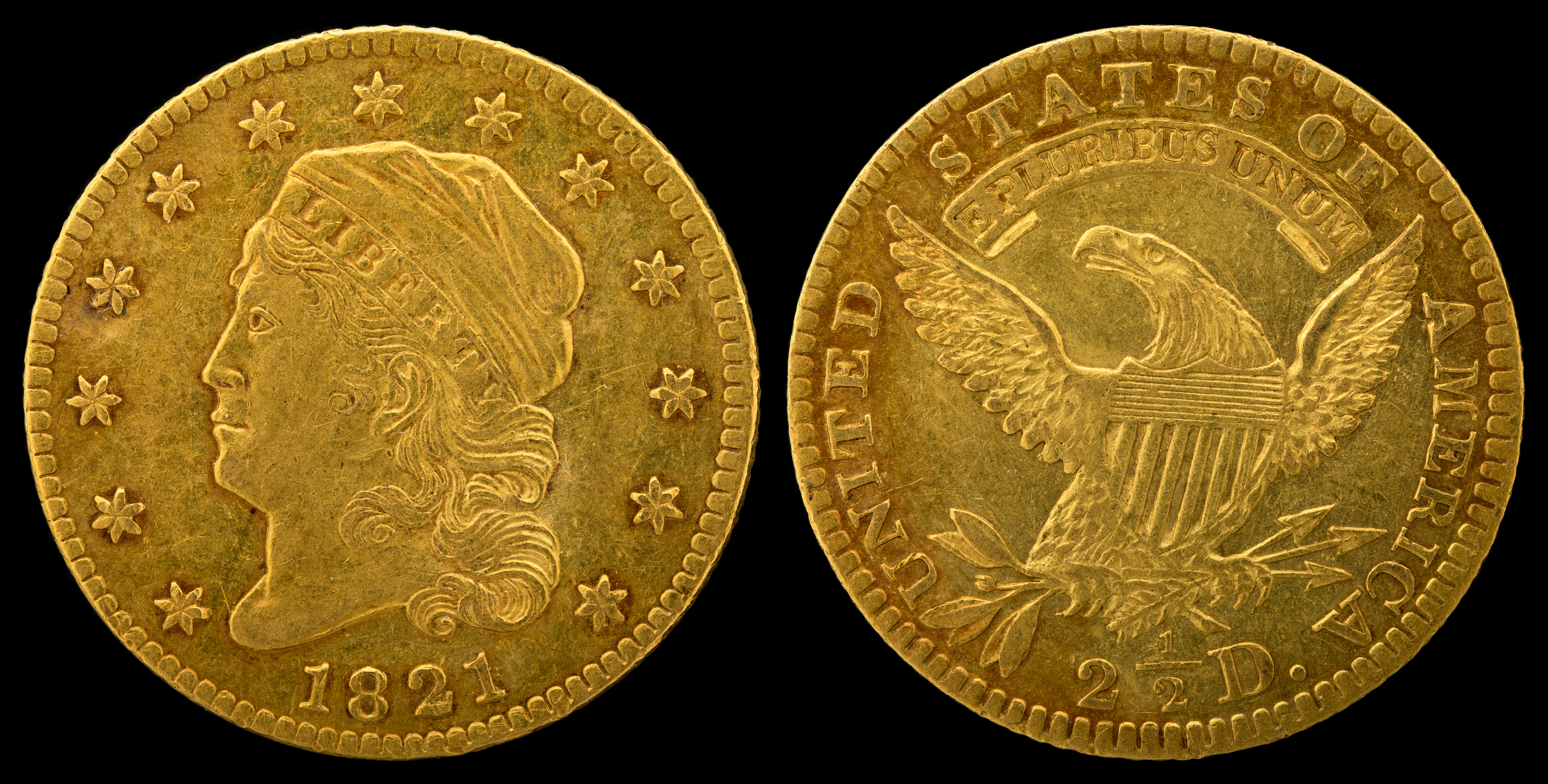
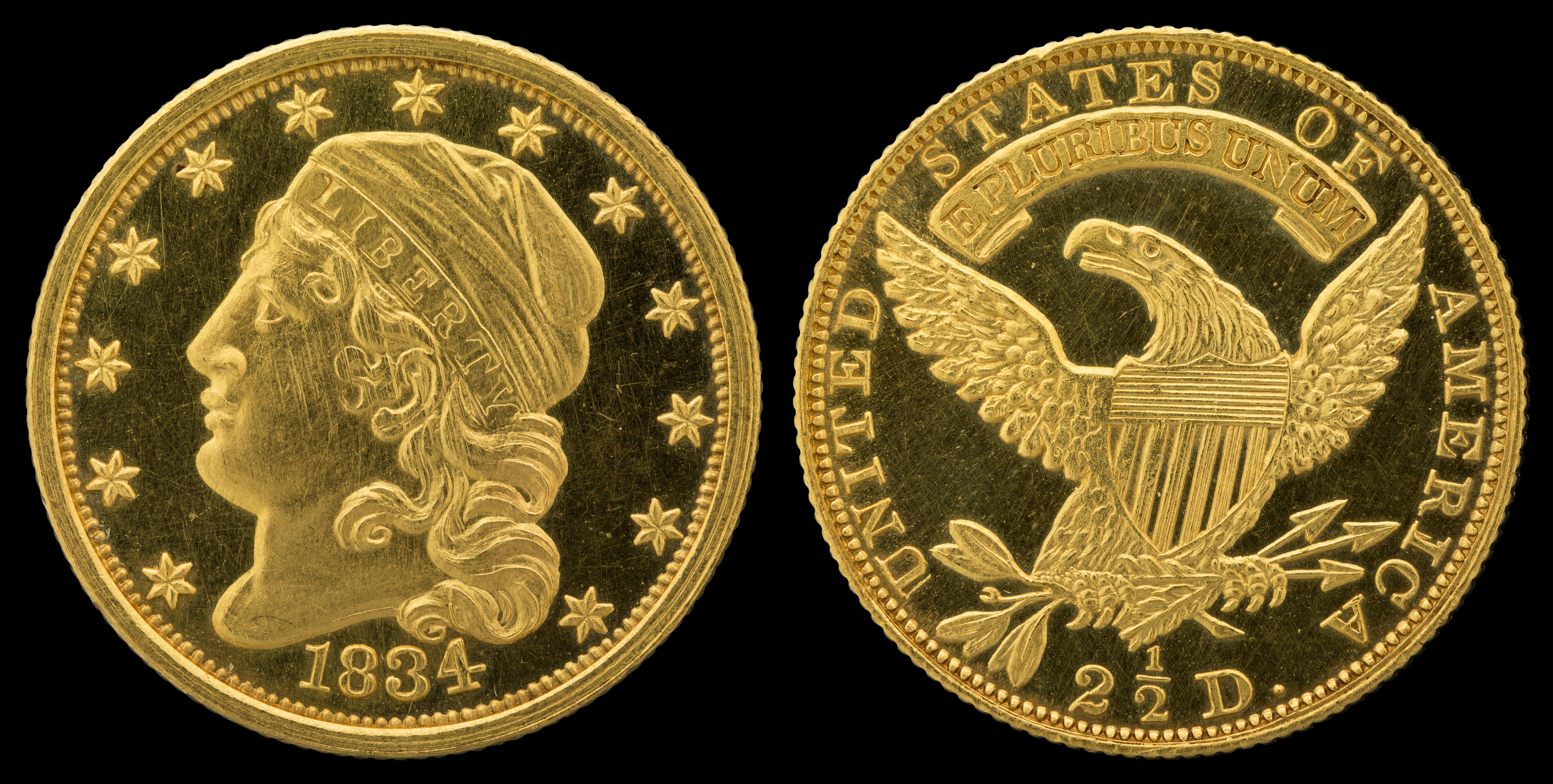
1808 "Capped Bust", 1821 "Capped Head", 1834 "Capped Head" (reduced)

=== Capped Bust ===
Also known as the "Turban Head", this interpretation of Liberty wearing a turban-like cap was designed by Robert Scot and was minted from 1796 to 1807, for a total of less than 20,000 coins minted.

There were three varieties of this design. First came the Capped Bust facing right variety. There were two variations of this design, no stars on the obverse, and stars on the obverse. The 'no stars' variety was produced only in 1796, replaced with the stars. In 1808, Liberty was redesigned by John Reich, to be wearing more of a traditional cap rather than a turban. This design was minted for 1808 only, but in 1821 the mint reinstated the quarter eagle and it was produced again until 1827, to 18.5 millimetres (0.73 in) from the original 20. In 1829, the quarter eagle was reduced in size again to 18.2 millimetres (0.72 in), and featured smaller letters and stars. This version of the design was produced until 1834.

=== Classic Head ===
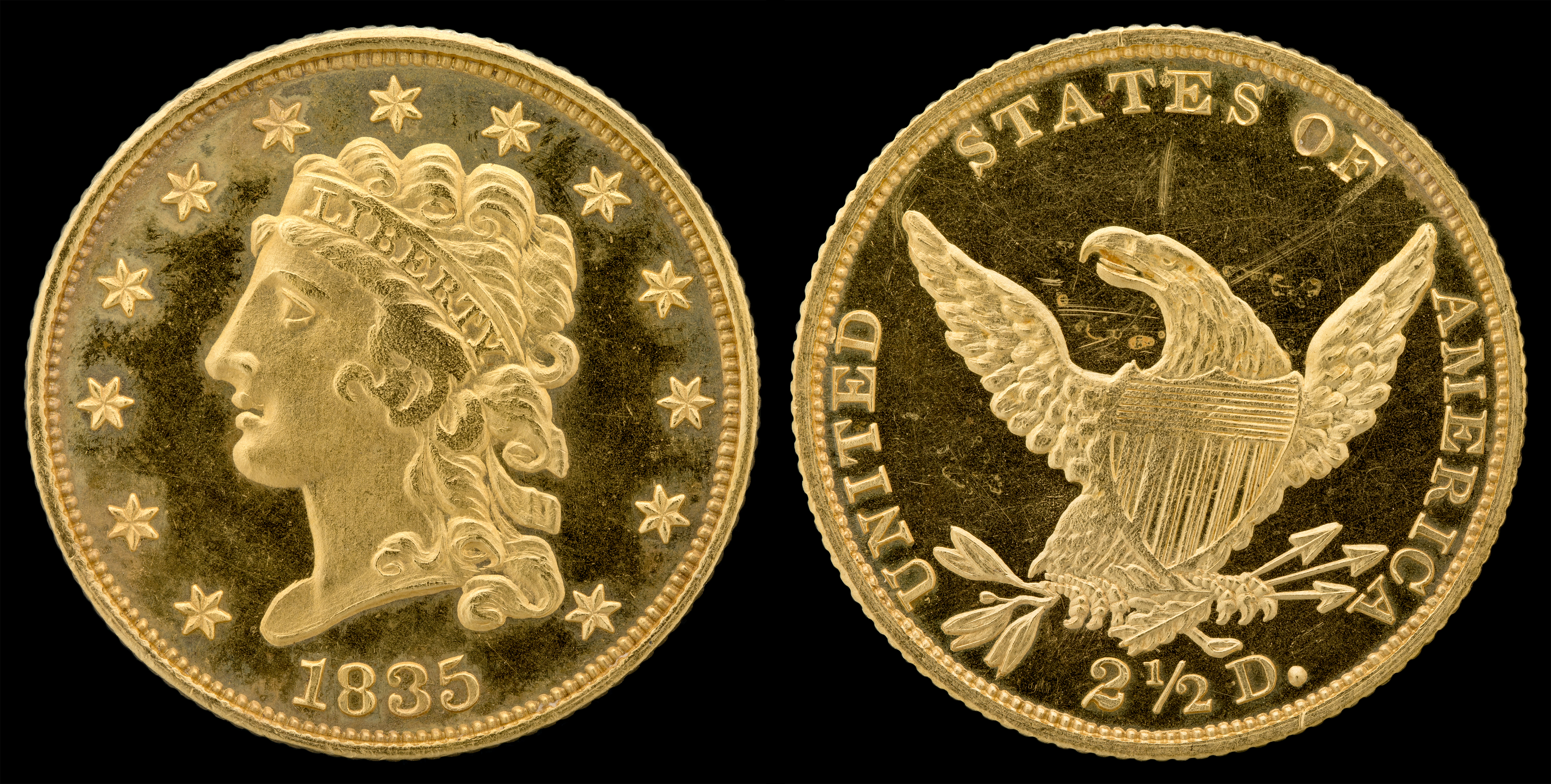
1835 "Classic Head" quarter eagle

The "Classic Head" variety was designed by William Kneass, which featured a traditional maiden with a ribbon binding her long, curly hair. This variety omitted E pluribus unum from the reverse of the coin. In 1840, a coronet and smaller head were designed to conform with the appearance of the larger gold coins, therefore making the Classic Head design obsolete.

The Classic Head design was produced from 1834 to 1839.

=== Liberty Head ===
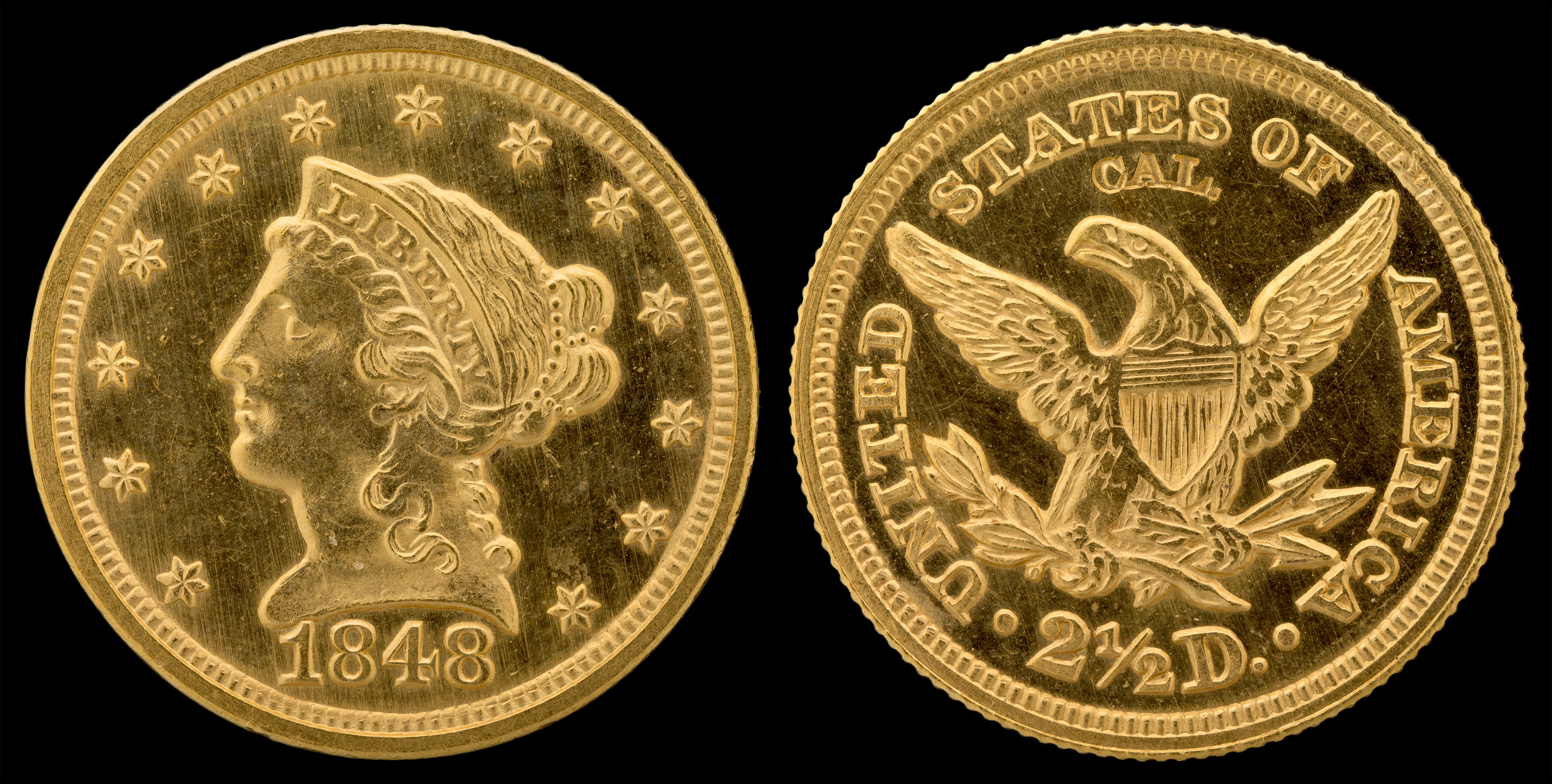
The 1848 "Liberty Head" quarter eagle punch-marked "CAL"

Also known as the "Coronet Head", the Liberty head was designed to match the styles of the other gold eagles the government was producing. The Liberty Head design was created by Christian Gobrecht and was produced successfully from 1840 to 1907, making it the most popular and longest of all of the designs for the quarter eagle. Like its predecessor, this variety omitted E Pluribus Unum from the reverse.

=== Indian Head ===
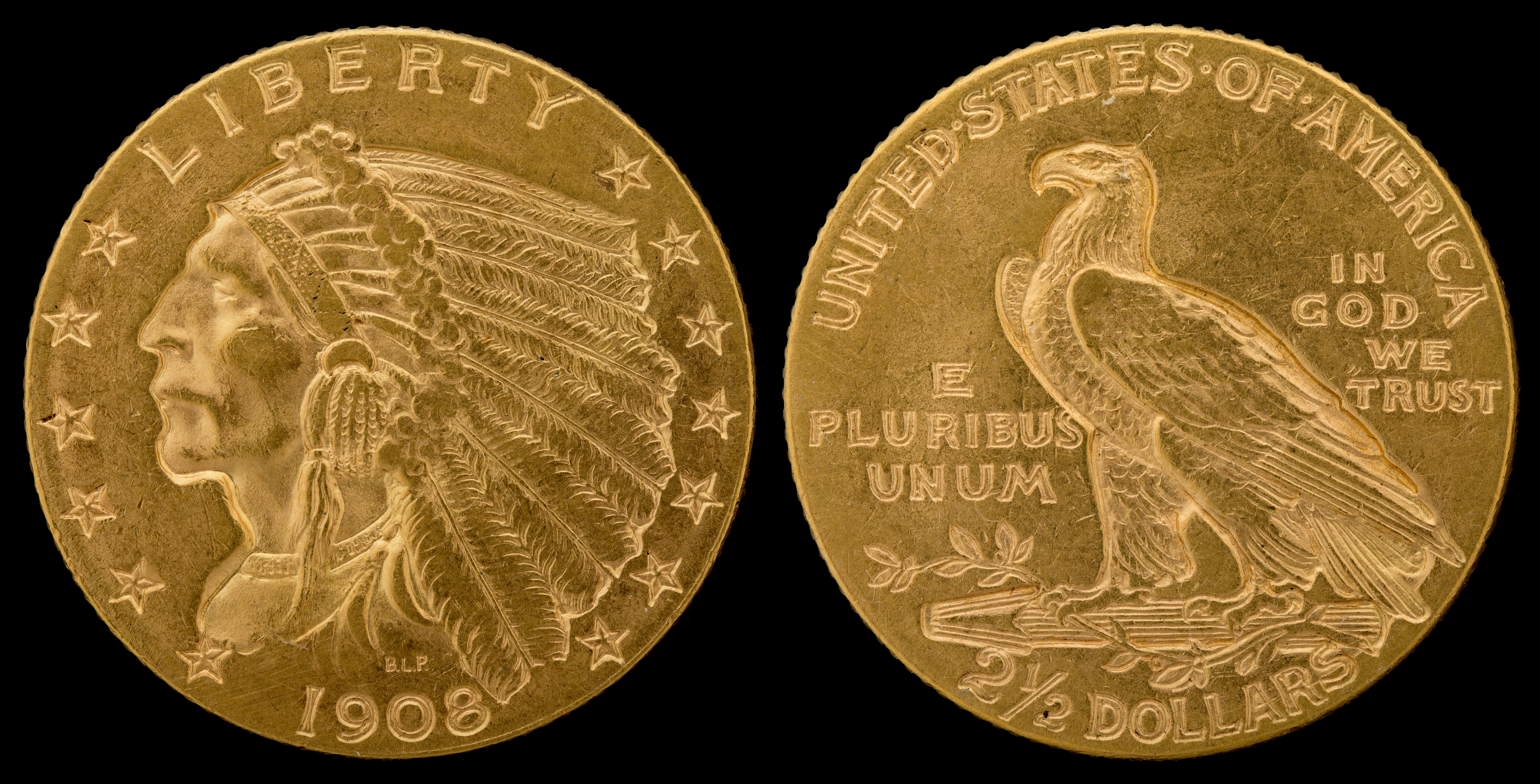
1908 Indian Head quarter eagle

The "Indian Head" design and the similar half eagle piece were created by Boston sculptor Bela Lyon Pratt. The coin was a departure from other examples of American coinage because it had no raised edges, instead featuring a design sunk into the planchet. The public had much distaste for the experimental and unusual design. Many feared that the recessed surfaces would collect germs, and others simply thought it was ugly. Numismatists took little interest in the coin. This resulted in few examples in uncirculated condition and the coin slipped into obscurity for many years. Later, however, collectors came to adore the exotic design and the coin is recognized as part of the creative renaissance of American coinage. The Indian Head design was produced from 1908 to 1929. It is frequently counterfeited.

== Commemorative issues ==
Two of the early United States commemorative coins are quarter eagles. The 1915-S was produced for the Panama-Pacific Exposition in San Francisco. The obverse depicts Liberty riding a hippocampus, while the reverse shows an eagle. Only 6,749 were sold. Considerably more common is the 1926 issue struck to commemorate the Sesquicentennial Exposition in Philadelphia. A total of 46,019 pieces were sold. The obverse shows Liberty standing on a globe and holding a torch and the United States Declaration of Independence, while the reverse pictures Independence Hall. Since the resumption of commemorative gold coin mintage in 1984 none have been struck in this denomination.
