= One Meridian Plaza =

Former office building in Philadelphia, Pennsylvania

- One Meridian Plaza in 1972

- Location within Philadelphia Location within Pennsylvania Location within the United States

General information
- Status: Demolished
- Type: Office
- Location: Philadelphia, Pennsylvania, U.S.
- Coordinates: 39°57′5″N 75°9′53″W
- Construction started: 1968
- Completed: 1972
- Demolished: 1999 (heavily damaged in February 1991)
- Cost: US$40 million

Height
- Roof: 492 ft (150 m)

Technical details
- Floor count: 38
- Floor area: 756,000 sq ft (70,200 m^{2})

Design and construction
- Architect: Vincent Kling & Associates
- Developer: Girard Bank; Fidelity Mutual Life Insurance

One Meridian Plaza, formerly known as the Fidelity Mutual Life Building, Three Girard Plaza and Three Mellon Bank Center, was a 38-story high-rise office building in Philadelphia, Pennsylvania, United States. The 492-foot (150-meter) tower was designed by Vincent Kling & Associates and completed in 1972.

On February 23, 1991, a twelve-alarm fire began on the 22nd floor and raged out of control for nineteen hours. Philadelphia firefighters fought the blaze but struggled due to a lack of power in the skyscraper and insufficient water pressure from the building's standpipes. Three firefighters died in the fire after becoming disoriented by heavy smoke. Firefighting efforts inside the building were eventually abandoned, due to fears the structure would collapse. The fire was only brought under control once it reached the 30th floor, which was one of the few floors that had automatic sprinklers installed. Ten sprinklers held back the fire until it started burning itself out and was finally brought under control.

The blaze seriously damaged One Meridian Plaza, destroying eight floors and damaging neighboring buildings in the Center City district. An investigation of the fire, led by the Office of the Fire Marshal of the City of Philadelphia with assistance from the Bureau of Alcohol, Tobacco, Firearms and Explosives (ATF) national investigative response team, determined the blaze started after linseed oil–soaked rags ignited.

For eight years after the fire, One Meridian Plaza sat vacant and damaged. The building was caught in litigation between its owners and the insurance company over how much the insurers would pay the owners and how repairs or demolition would proceed. Businesses near the empty high-rise closed or moved, and the city brought the owners to court to resolve the building's fate. After lawsuits were settled, the building was declared a total loss and was demolished in 1999. The lot was later used for the Residences at the Ritz-Carlton, which was completed ten years later.

== Building ==
One Meridian Plaza was a 38-story high-rise office building designed by Vincent Kling & Associates. Construction on the 492 ft (150 m) tower began in 1968, was completed in 1972 and approved for occupancy in 1973. Built at the corner of 15th Street and South Penn Square in Center City, the central business district of Philadelphia, the $40 million high-rise was built adjacent to the Girard Trust Building and Philadelphia City Hall across the street. At one point there were plans to build a structure to the south of the building that would share one of the elevator banks in the high-rise, but nothing came of the plans mainly because the two sites had different owners. Upon completion, the high-rise was the tallest building constructed in Philadelphia since the early 1930s.

The rectangular building was 243 feet (74 m) long and 92 feet (28 m) wide, and contained 756,000 square feet (70,000 m^{2}). Of the thirty-eight floors, thirty-six were occupiable and two were mechanical floors. The structure also had three underground levels. The building's structure was composed of steel and concrete, and the facade was a granite curtain wall. There were two helipads on the roof. The building's eastern stairwell connected the building to the adjacent Girard Trust Building, then known as Two Girard Plaza.

On the northwest corner of the complex was a bronze sculpture called Triune. Designed by Robert Engman, the abstract sculpture was not damaged in the fire and was still at the site in 1999. The following year, the builders of The Residences at The Ritz-Carlton announced that they were considering demolishing the sculpture. In the end, however, the sculpture was retained and as of 2014 still stood where it was originally installed.

When One Meridian Plaza was built, the City of Philadelphia was enforcing a building code from 1949 that made no distinction between high-rises and other buildings. In 1984, the city adopted new codes that required automatic sprinkler systems in new buildings. At the time of construction, sprinklers were only built on the service levels below ground. Plans were put in place to have automatic sprinklers placed throughout One Meridian Plaza by November 1993. By 1991 only four floors were completely protected by sprinklers and three other floors were partially protected. The sprinklers had been installed during floor renovations at the request of tenants, and the building's owners had plans to install more as other floors were renovated.

The high-rise was originally known as Fidelity Mutual Life Building, named for Fidelity Mutual Life Insurance Company, which developed the building in a joint venture with Girard Bank. Girard Bank sold its share of the property to Fidelity Mutual Life in 1982. Fidelity Mutual Life, which had moved its offices out of the building to Radnor Township earlier that year, in turn sold the building to E/R Partners in 1983. A joint venture of the Rubin Organization and Equitable Life Assurance Company of America, E/R Partners bought the property for $143 million. In 1989 a Dutch pension fund, Algemeen Burgerlijk Pensioenfonds, paid $120 million to enter E/R Partners with a sixty-five percent stake in the building. In 1984, Three Girard Plaza became Three Mellon Bank Center after Girard Bank was bought by Mellon Bank. After Meridian Bank replaced Mellon Bank as the lead tenant, the building became One Meridian Plaza, and Meridian installed a sign with the building's new name in December 1989. Another major tenant was Comcast, who made 81,000 square feet (7,500 m^{2}) of the building its corporate headquarters in 1989.

== Fire ==
On Saturday February 23, 1991, at about 8:23 p.m., a fire began on the 22nd floor of One Meridian Plaza. There were only three people in the building at the time, an engineer and two security guards. Workers had been refinishing woodwork in a vacant office earlier in the day, and left a pile of rags soaked in linseed oil on the floor. The linseed oil oxidized and generated enough heat to ignite the rags, which then set fire to other solvents nearby. Smoke detectors did not cover the entire floor and by the time the fire alarm went off, the fire was already well established.

After the fire alarm sounded, the engineer went up to the 22nd floor to investigate. When the elevator reached the 22nd floor, the engineer found heavy smoke and heat that prevented him from reaching the elevator controls he needed to return to the lobby. The engineer escaped after radioing to a security guard in the lobby to recall the elevator using fire safety controls there. The second security guard was on the 30th floor when the alarm went off and used the stairwell to get to the ground floor.

The lobby guard returned a call to the alarm monitoring service, which had called when the alarm initially went off to confirm that there was a fire, but never called the Philadelphia Fire Department (PFD). The first call came from someone on the street who saw smoke coming from the building. During the first 9-1-1 call, at about 8:27 p.m., the alarm company alerted the PFD to the fire. Engine 43 was the first firefighting unit to arrive at the scene and reported seeing heavy smoke and flames in one of the windows. By this time the fire had grown, with flames breaking through windows and lapping up the side of the building.

=== Problems ===
Firefighters began experiencing problems before they even reached the fire. By the time they reached the 11th floor, the building had lost power after the heat from the blaze damaged electrical cables. The emergency generator never began producing electricity, and despite efforts to restore power the building was without electricity for the entirety of the event. This forced firefighters to work in darkness and without the aid of elevators. In addition, the transformers that provided power to the neighboring Girard Trust Building were in the basement of One Meridian Plaza. The transformers were eventually shut down due to water accumulation in the basement, and firefighters directing water streams from that building had to do so without the aid of elevators.

Firefighters were again hampered when it was discovered the pressure reducing valves on the building's standpipes were improperly adjusted when installed in the building. The PFD's automatic nozzles required 100 psi (690 kPa) at the nozzle, while the building's pressure reducing valves provided less than 60 psi (410 kPa) at the outlet, which was not sufficient to fight the fire. It was several hours into the incident before a technician who could adjust the valves arrived at the scene.

The area around One Meridian Plaza was cleared of pedestrians and firefighting personnel because of falling glass and debris. The debris was dangerous for firefighters because they often had to cross the perimeter around the building to enter and leave the high-rise. Hose lines stretched into the building were damaged by debris, and one firefighter was struck and seriously injured by debris while tending to the lines.

=== Firefighters killed ===
Victims
Captain David P. Holcombe, age 52
Firefighter Phyllis McAllister, age 43
Firefighter James A. Chappell, age 29

During the second hour of the incident, the fire spread onto the 23rd and 24th floors. Heavy smoke was building up in the stairwells and a captain and two firefighters from Engine 11 were assigned to go to the top level to ventilate the stairwells. The three firefighters went up a center staircase from the 22nd floor and soon radioed that they were disoriented by heavy smoke on the 30th floor. There were attempts to direct the firefighters through the radio, and soon after the captain requested permission to break a window for ventilation, which was followed by a message that the captain was down. Permission to break the window was given and a search and rescue effort was initiated.

Search teams were sent from the lower floors and searched the 30th floor, but did not find the missing firefighters. The teams then moved onto the upper levels where one team got lost on the 38th floor and ran out of air in their self-contained breathing apparatus (SCBAs). That team was rescued by another search team that had been placed on the roof by helicopter. Rescue attempts continued until helicopter operations were suspended due to heavy smoke and thermal drafts caused by the blaze.

Using a searchlight, the helicopter crew searched the exterior of the building and at 1:17 a.m. February 23, the crew spotted a broken window on the 28th floor located in an area that could not be seen from the street. At about 2:15 a.m. a rescue team was sent to the spot and found the three missing firefighters unconscious and out of air in their SCBAs. The firefighters were taken to a medical triage set up on the 20th floor. There were attempts at resuscitation, but they were unsuccessful and the firefighters were pronounced dead.

=== Fire's end ===
As the fire was going into its sixth hour it had spread up to the 26th floor. With inadequate water pressure coming from the standpipes, firefighters stretched hoses up the building's stairwells to help fight the fire. While hoses were being taken up to the fire, a sprinkler technician arrived to fix the water pressure. This improved the hose streams, but the fire had engulfed several floors and could not be contained with just hoses. By 7 a.m., almost eleven hours into the fire, firefighters were able to get control of the fire on the 22nd through 24th floors, but the fire was still out of control on the 25th and 26th floors and was spreading upwards.

Structural damage observed inside One Meridian Plaza by firefighters, and consultations with a structural engineer, led to fears that the damaged floors might collapse. An order to evacuate the building was issued by Fire Commissioner Roger Ulshafer, and the building was completely evacuated by 7:30. After the evacuation, the only fire suppression efforts left were water streams being directed to the building from the neighboring Girard Trust Building and One Centre Square.

The fire's spread only stopped when it reached the 30th floor, which was the first fire-affected floor to have automatic sprinklers. Ten sprinklers extinguished the fire on the 30th floor and prevented continued spread. Contained by the sprinklers and running out of fuel, the fire was declared under control at 3:01 p.m.. The fire lasted over nineteen hours, destroyed eight floors, and killed three firefighters and injured twenty-four. Twelve alarms were called, which brought fifty-one engine companies, fifteen ladder companies, eleven specialized units, and over 300 firefighters. It caused an estimated $100 million in direct property loss.

== After the fire ==
By February 26, city officials had determined One Meridian Plaza was not in danger of collapse. There was structural damage to horizontal steel beams and floor sections on most of the fire damaged floors. Under extreme fire exposure the beams and girders sagged and twisted and cracks appeared in the concrete floors. However, the overall structure was stable and able to support the weight of the building. Thermal expansion of the steel frame caused some of the granite panels to be dislodged from the building's facade. The streets and buildings around One Meridian Plaza were closed and cordoned off.

The 20-story Morris Building and several three-story shops behind One Meridian Plaza on Chestnut Street were damaged by falling debris and sat unused until they were demolished in 2000. The neighboring Girard Trust Building experienced extensive water damage, forcing the closure of the building; a bank in the building reopened a month later but the rest of the tower remained vacant for years. The roads around the building were closed for months after the fire, including a portion of two of Philadelphia's major streets, Broad and Market.

The removal of the uninhabitable One Meridian Plaza from the real estate market and the sudden relocation of the building's tenants to other offices in Philadelphia took 1.5 million square feet (140,000 m^{2}) of real estate off the market. The city's office vacancy rate was 14.3 percent at the end of 1990; in the two months after the fire, the vacancy rate lowered to 10.7 percent. On December 18, Mayor Wilson Goode signed a law requiring every nonresidential building 75 feet (23 m) tall or taller have sprinklers installed by 1997. An estimated 300 buildings in the city were affected by the law.

=== Vacant "eyesore" ===
In the years after the fire, One Meridian Plaza stood vacant in the middle of Philadelphia. The fate of the building was undecided as its owners, E/R Partners, and its insurer, Aetna, prepared for litigation on how to proceed with repairs, who would control those repairs, and at what cost. E/R Partners proposed deconstructing the building to its 19th floor, then rebuilding from there. Aetna claimed that girders above the 19th level could be repaired and used, cutting $115 million in repair costs from the owner's $250 million estimate. Aetna also proposed taking over the reconstruction. E/R Partners spent $50 million securing One Meridian Plaza and up to $500,000 a month on security guards, utilities, and inspections by engineers while the building stood empty.

Lawsuits on behalf of sixteen people and businesses claiming losses as a result of the fire were filed shortly after the disaster. In February 1995, a $15 million agreement was reached to reimburse workers and businesses affected by the fire. While not admitting any liability, the $15 million minus legal fees was paid by E/R Partners and was meant for uninsured losses for businesses and workers in One Meridian Plaza and the surrounding damaged buildings.

The burned, empty tower was declared "eyesore of the year" and an embarrassment to the city by The Philadelphia Inquirer in 1994; the editorial said the feeling was heightened after the building could be seen in the background in the film Philadelphia.

The fire left the Center City district a commercial void; most major stores in the area closed and property values fell. Neighboring property owners, such as the owner of the damaged buildings behind One Meridian Plaza, were waiting for a decision on the future of the building before going through with their own development plans. In 1996, the City of Philadelphia sued E/R Partners, asserting that the building was an environmental hazard and should be demolished or repaired.

=== Demolition ===
In March 1997, E/R Partners settled with Aetna, receiving around $300 million. After the legal issues were resolved, E/R Partners announced the building would be dismantled. With the announcement of the demolition the city dropped its lawsuit. Unable to implode One Meridian Plaza because of the building density of the area, E/R Partners began an eighteen-month, $23 million process to dismantle the building. E/R Partners initially wanted to demolish only the heavily-damaged upper half of One Meridian Plaza, with plans to resell the lower half, but with no potential buyers being identified by late 1998, E/R indicated that it would destroy the bottom half as well. The process was finished in 1999. At the time of the demolition it was the third tallest habitable building ever razed.

== Replacement ==
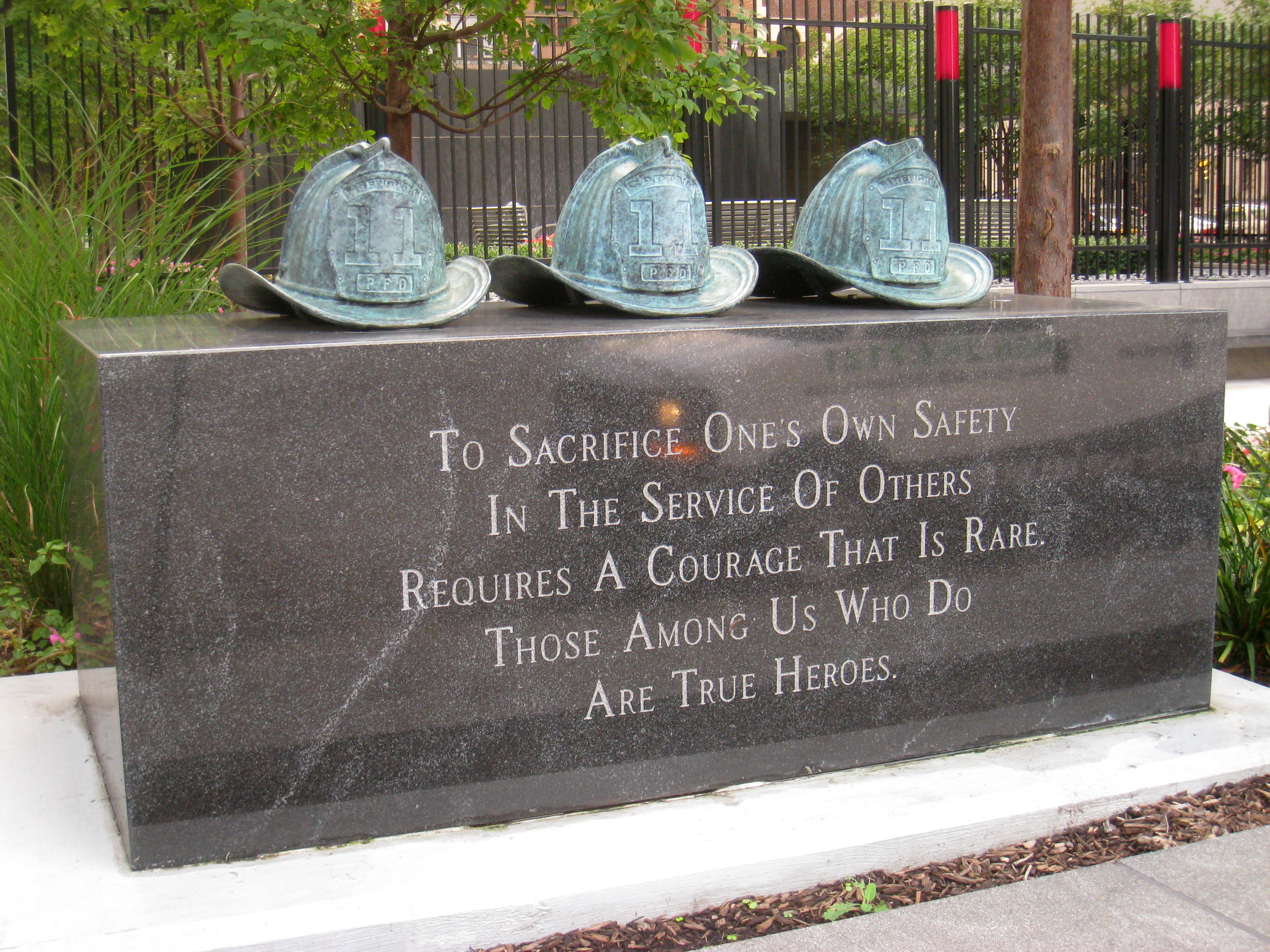
Memorial to fire fighters

The site of One Meridian Plaza was bought by the Arden Group in 2000. The site was converted into a parking lot as construction on a new building was held up in a zoning feud with the neighboring site, 1441 Chestnut Street, the former location of the Morris Building and other smaller buildings that had sat behind One Meridian Plaza. The feud between Arden Group's CEO Craig Spencer and 1441 Chestnut Street developer Mariner Commercial Properties, Inc. CEO Tim Mahoney began in 2003. Spencer and Mahoney settled their dispute in March 2006 and construction on One Meridian's 48-story replacement, the Residences at the Ritz-Carlton, began in May. The Residences at The Ritz-Carlton opened in January 2009. The other replacement building, The W Philadelphia and Element Philadelphia, a building that contains two separate hotels in one, opened in 2021 along Chestnut Street.

A memorial was unveiled on October 21, 2009, at the Residences honoring the three firefighters who died in the fire. The memorial features three bronze firefighter helmets atop a marble base with the firefighters' names on it. It sits in an empty area between the condo building and the adjacent hotel along the south side of South Penn Square across from the SW corner of Dilworth Park.

== See also ==
- First Interstate Tower fire
- Skyscraper fire
- List of tallest voluntarily demolished buildings
