= The Residences at the Ritz-Carlton =

The Residences at the Ritz-Carlton may refer to:

- The Residences at The Ritz-Carlton (Philadelphia), a luxury residential skyscraper in Philadelphia, Pennsylvania, United States
- The Residences at the Ritz-Carlton (Toronto), a luxury hotel and residential skyscraper in Toronto, Ontario, Canada

== See also ==
- Ritz-Carlton, a brand of luxury hotels
