= Philadelphia Mint =

Continental national mint of the United States

Coordinates: 39.9536°N 75.1474°W

The Philadelphia Mint is a branch of the United States Mint in Philadelphia. It was built in 1792 following the Coinage Act of 1792, in order to establish a national identity and the needs of commerce in the United States, and is the first and oldest national mint.

== History ==
=== First building (1792–1833) ===
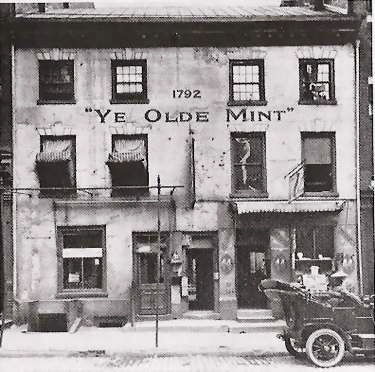
The first Philadelphia Mint, built in 1792, photographed in 1908, and later demolished

The Coinage Act of 1792 entered into law on April 2, proclaiming the creation of the United States Mint. Philadelphia at that time was the nation's capital, and the first mint facility was built there. David Rittenhouse, an American scientist, was appointed the first director of the mint by President George Washington. Two lots were purchased by Rittenhouse on July 18, 1792, at Seventh Street and 631 Filbert Street in Philadelphia for $4,266.67. The next day, demolition of an abandoned whiskey distillery on the property began. Foundation work began on July 31; by September 7, the first building was ready for installation of the smelting furnace. The smelt house was the first public building erected by the United States government.

A three-story brick structure facing Seventh Street was constructed a few months later. Measuring nearly 37 ft (11 m) wide on the street, it only extended back 33 ft (10 m). The gold and silver for the mint were contained in basement vaults. The first floor housed deposit and weighing rooms, along with the press room, where striking coins took place. Mint official offices were on the second floor, and the assay office was located on the third floor. A photograph of the Seventh Street building taken around 1908 show that by then, the year 1792 and the words "Ye Olde Mint" (in quotes) had been painted onto the facade.

Between the smelt house and the building on Seventh Street, a mill house was built. Horses in the basement turned a rolling mill located on the first floor.

In January 1816, the smelt and mill houses were destroyed by a fire. The smelt house was never repaired and all smelting was done elsewhere. The mill house, which was completely destroyed, was soon replaced with a large brick building. It included a new steam engine in the basement to power the machinery.

Until 1833, these three buildings provided the United States with hard currency. Operations moved to the second Philadelphia mint in 1833, and the land housing the first mint was sold. In the late 19th or early 20th century, the property was sold to Frank Stewart, who approached the city, asking them to preserve or relocate the historic buildings. With no governmental help, the first mint was demolished between 1907 and 1911. Now, only a small plaque remains to memorialize the spot.

=== Second building (1833–1901) ===
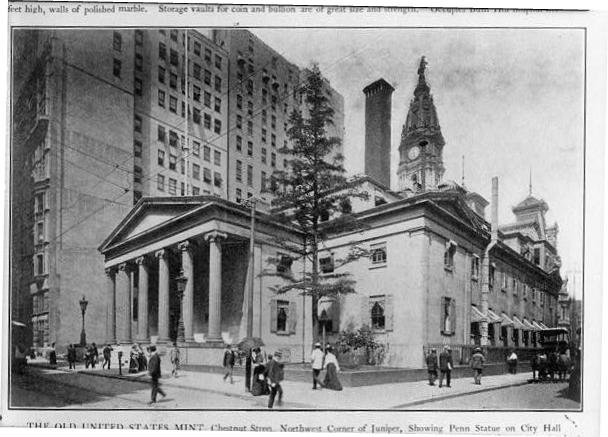
The second Philadelphia Mint, built in 1833, photographed in 1902, and since demolished

On July 4, 1829, a cornerstone was laid for the building at the intersection of Chestnut and Juniper Streets. It was designed by William Strickland. The second Philadelphia Mint, the "Grecian Temple", was constructed of white marble with classic Greek-style columns on front and back. Measuring 150 ft (46 m) wide in front by 204 ft (62 m) deep, it was a huge improvement over the first facility, in space as well as image. Opening in January 1833, its production was constrained by the outdated machinery salvaged from the first mint. Franklin Peale was sent to Europe to study advanced coin-making technologies which were brought back and implemented, increasing productivity and quality.

Sold in 1902, the second mint was quickly demolished. The cornerstone buried in 1829 was unearthed and contained a candy jar with a petrified cork stoppering it. Inside the jar were three coins, a few newspapers, and a scroll with information on the first mint and the creation of the second.

The site has been occupied since 1914 by the 19-story Widener Building, 1339 Chestnut Street.

=== Third building (1901–1969) ===
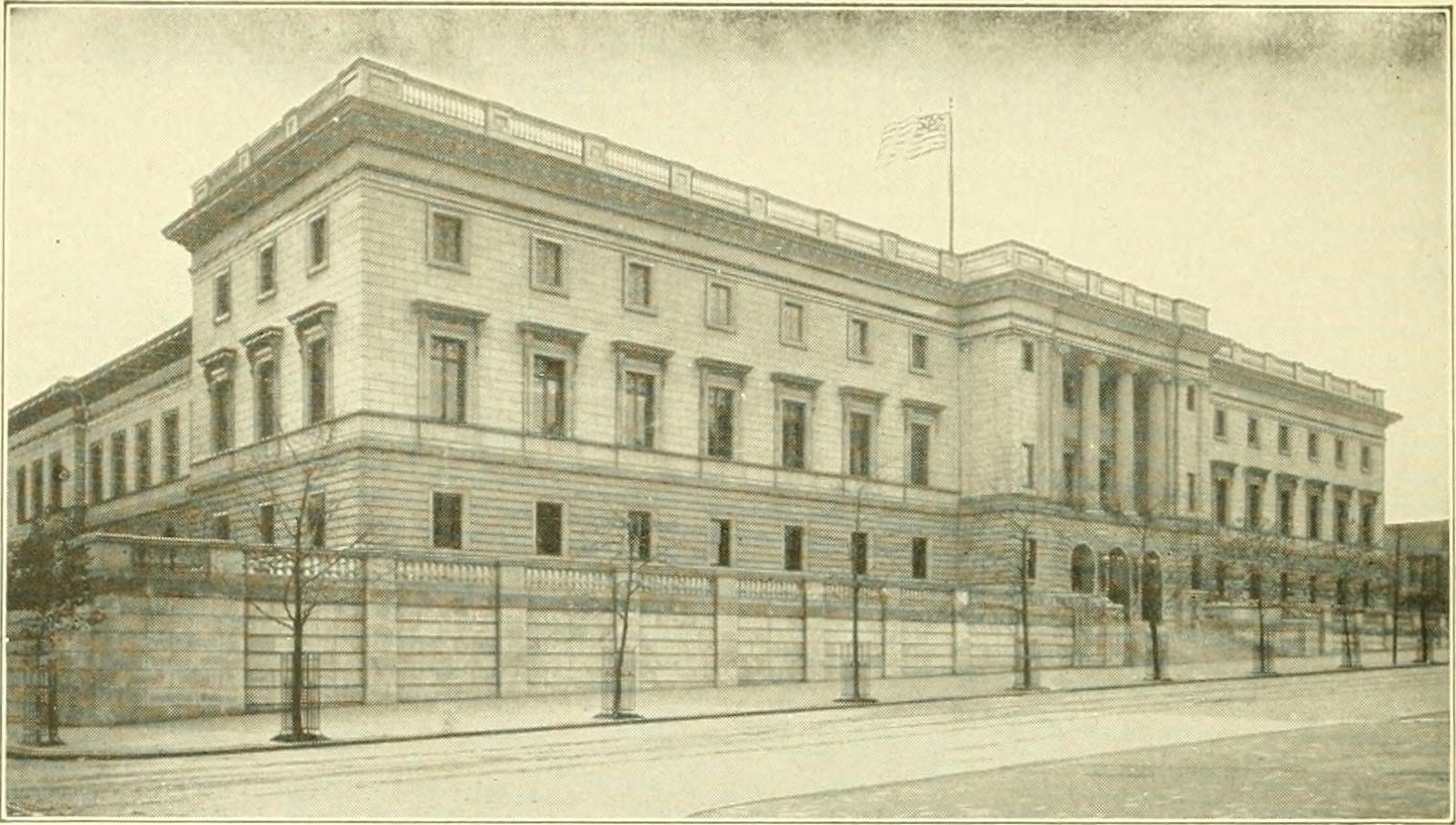
A 1901 illustration of the third Philadelphia Mint, now part of the Community College of Philadelphia

The third Philadelphia Mint was built at 1600 Spring Garden Street and opened in 1901. It was designed by William Martin Aiken, Architect for the Treasury, but it was constructed under James Knox Taylor. In one year alone, the mint produced 501 million coins (5/7 of the U.S. currency minted), and 90 million coins for foreign countries.

A massive structure nearly a full city block, it was an instant landmark, characterized by a Roman temple facade. Visitors enjoyed seven themed glass mosaics designed by Louis C. Tiffany in a gold-backed vaulted ceiling. The mosaics depicted ancient Roman coinmaking methods. This mint still stands intact, and much of the interior is intact, as well. It was acquired by the Community College of Philadelphia in 1971 which retains a gallery in tribute to its history.

=== Fourth and current building (1969–present) ===
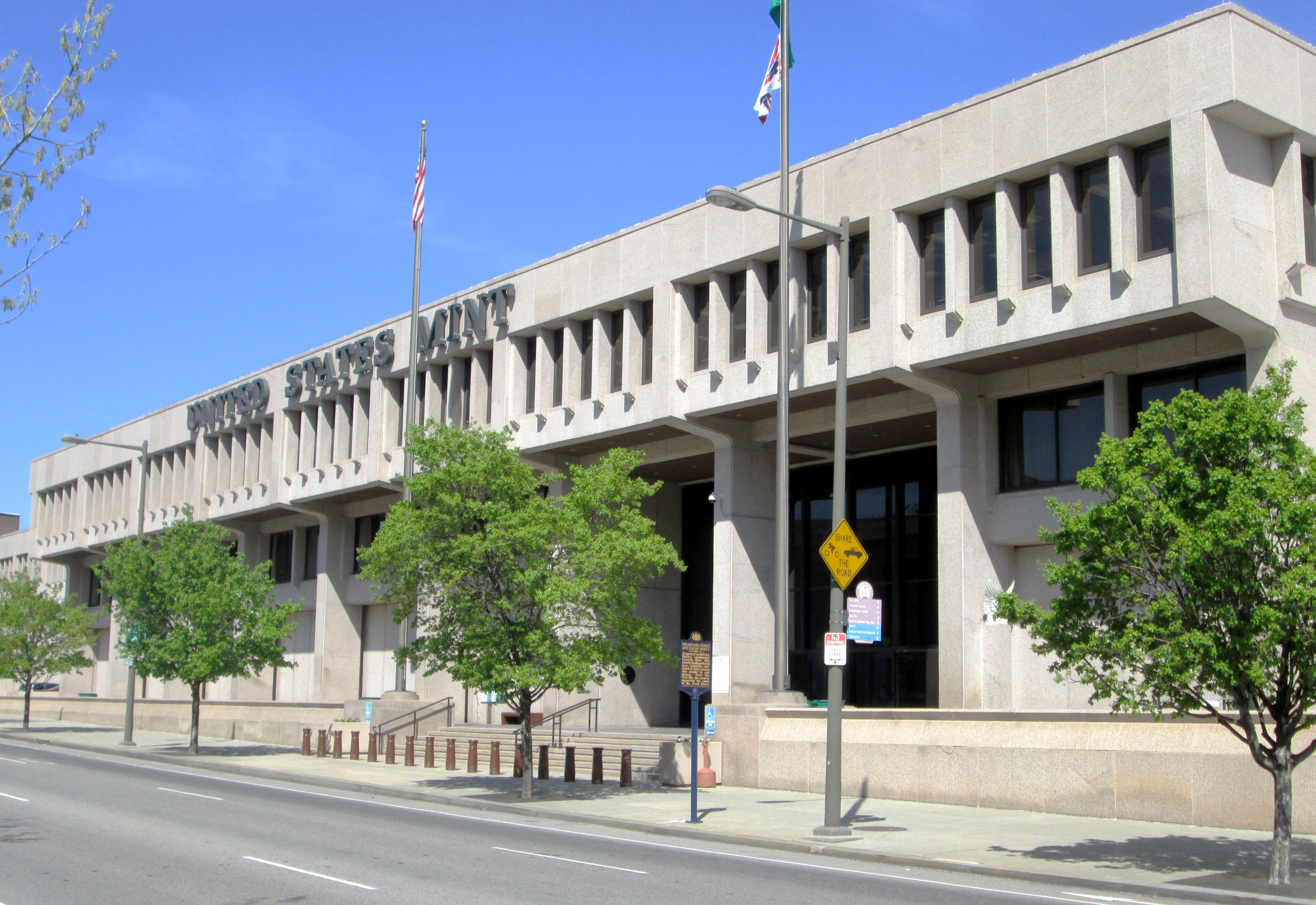
The present Philadelphia Mint, built in 1969, pictured in 2013

Two blocks from the site of the first mint, the fourth and current Philadelphia Mint opened its doors in 1969. It was designed by Philadelphia architect Vincent G. Kling, who also helped design Five Penn Center, Centre Square, and the Annenberg Center for the Performing Arts. The Tiffany glass mosaics from the Third mint were re-installed in the new facility. It was the world's largest mint when it was built and held that distinction as of October 2017.

The Philadelphia Mint can produce up to one million coins in 30 minutes. The mint also produces medals and awards for military, governmental, and civil services. Engraving of all dies and strikers only occurs here. Uncirculated coins minted here have the "P" mint mark, while circulated coins from before 1980 carried no mint mark except the Jefferson nickels minted from 1942–1945 and the 1979 Susan B. Anthony dollar coins. Since 1980, all coins minted there have the "P" mint mark except cents (although 2017 cents do have the "P" mint mark).

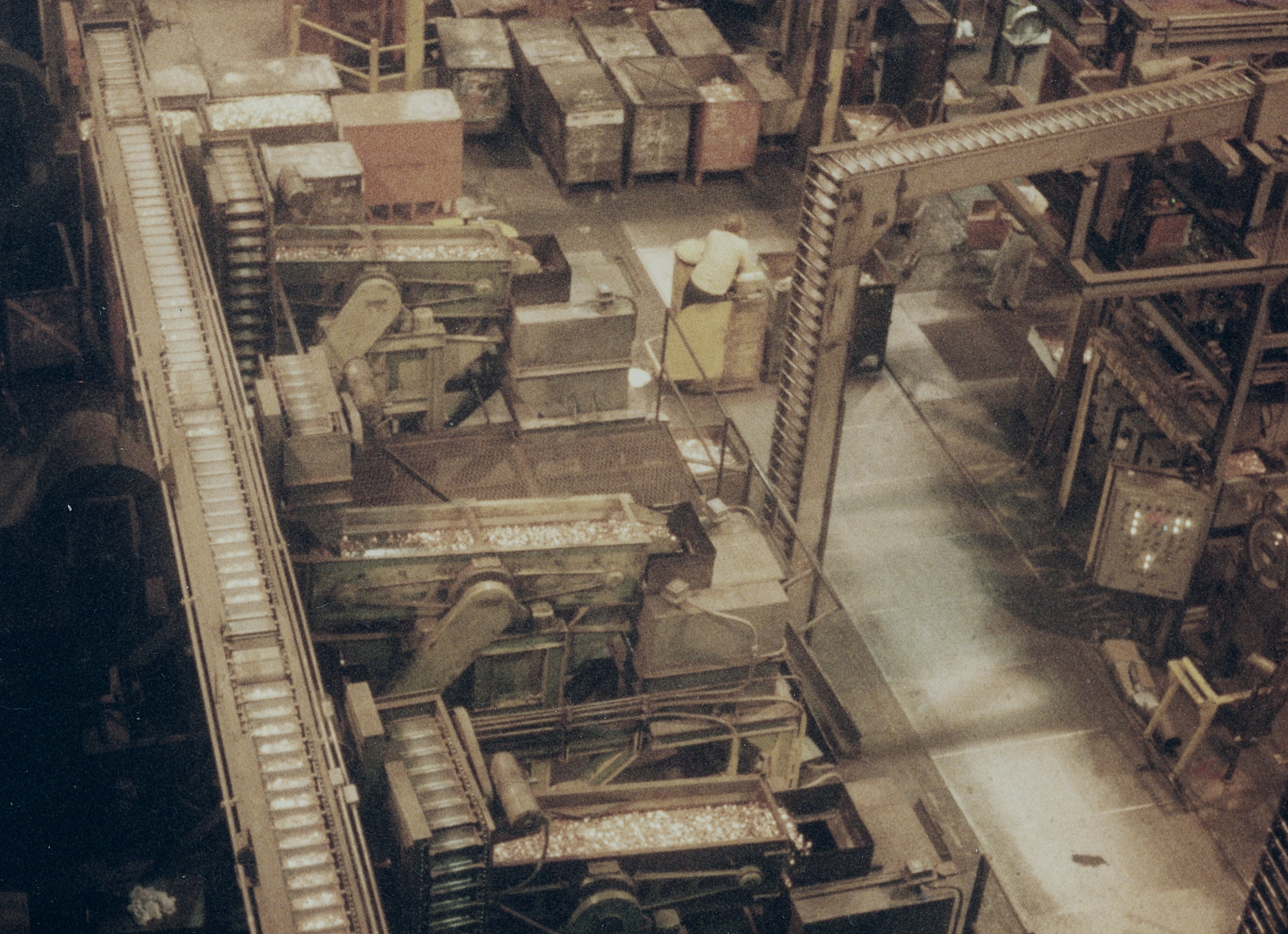
Interior of the mint, 1984

Public tours of the Philadelphia Mint are available in which all stages of the minting process are explained, along with displays of past equipment. This takes place via an enclosed catwalk above the minting facility itself. Various video stations are placed along the tour route, where visitors can push buttons to watch videos about various stages of the minting process.

Most of the videos on the tour were narrated by Harry Kalas, a Baseball Hall of Fame announcer for the Philadelphia Phillies and NFL Films broadcaster.

== Thefts ==
=== 19th century ===
On August 19, 1858, two well-dressed thieves on a tour of the mint used a copied key to open a display case. They made off with $265 in gold pieces (equal in face value to $9861.06 today), but due to the rarity of the coins, the men were quickly apprehended while trying to spend them in local shops.

In 1893, Henry S. Cochran, a weighing clerk, was found to have embezzled $134,000 in gold bars from the mint vault (equal to $4,801,667 today) over a period of 8–10 years. A total of $107,000 was recovered from his home and from a cache in the ventilation system inside the mint.

=== 20th century ===
About 445,000 double eagle coins were minted in 1933, but only one was ever legally released. King Farouk of Egypt contacted Nellie Tayloe Ross, then Director of the U.S. Mint, and requested one 1933 double eagle for his extensive coin collection. Since the 1933 coins were not circulated, she took one coin to the Smithsonian Institution and received documentation of its rarity. She then issued an export document allowing the Egyptian king to receive his coin. After the deaths of Farouk and the general who inherited the king's collection, the coin disappeared into a European collector's possession. It resurfaced when Stephen Fenton acquired it. When he tried to auction it off, both he and the auctioneer were arrested and the coin was seized. It was placed in the vault of the Secret Service in their office in the World Trade Center. While the provenance and paperwork proving ownership was debated ad nauseam in courts, the coin was transferred to Fort Knox for further safekeeping. The World Trade Center was attacked and destroyed later that year.

An agreement was later reached between the U.S. federal government and Stephen Fenton in which the Fenton Farouk, as it came to be called, was sold at auction for $7.9 million in 2002 with a 10% auctioneer's premium and $20 to monetize the coin. Fenton and the government split the proceeds of the auction, with the provision that any further 1933 double eagles would be seized and not auctioned.

=== 21st century ===
In 2003, a Philadelphia woman named Joan Switt Langbord found ten 1933 double eagles in a safe deposit box that once belonged to her parents; when she took them to be appraised, they were seized by the United States Treasury as stolen property. Investigators claimed that Langbord's father, Israel Switt, conspired with a clerk inside the mint to steal the coins. He had been investigated previously for the crime, leading to the confiscation of several gold pieces, but the statute of limitations had prevented him from being prosecuted.

Langbord sued to have the coins returned to her. In July 2011, however, a federal jury ruled the stolen coins were property of the U.S. government.

In September 2011, former mint officer William Gray pleaded guilty in federal court to stealing error coins valued at $2.4 million and selling them to a distributor.

== See also ==
- List of mints
- Historical United States mints
- Charlotte Mint
- Dahlonega Mint
- Denver Mint
- New Orleans Mint
- San Francisco Mint
