= The Boomer Bible =

Book about things that are believed

Cover of The Boomer Bible, published in 1991

The Boomer Bible is a book written by R. F. Laird. In structure, the book is based on the Christian Bible, but it is neither a simple parody of the Bible nor is it sacrilegious specifically toward the Bible or Christianity. Laird described the book as expressing the things people truly believe as opposed to what they say they believe.

== Structure ==
The core of the Boomer Bible consists of The Past Testament and The Present Testament, which correspond roughly to the Old and New Testaments.

The Past Testament contains a comprehensive view of science, history, philosophy, morality, and literature as understood by the Baby Boomers from pop culture and an ineffective educational system:

- The Books of Apes (Kinesis, Apes, Names, Gods, and Lies) which describe prehistory.
- The Books of peoples (Gypsies, Mesopotamians, Greeks, Romans, Barbarians, Christians, Bubonites, Giants, Explorers, Spics, Frogs, Brits, Krauts, Yanks, Beaks, Russkies, Chinks, Nips, and Others) which describe the history of various peoples of the Earth.
- The "PS" books (Psongs, Psayings, Psomethings, Pnotes, and Pspeciasties) which contain everything from the prayers of a Gatsby-like character for money, to poorly remembered snippets of literature, to numerology worthy of Nostradamus
- The Books of the VIPs (Adam, Chuck, Carl, Ziggie, Dave, Al, Paul, Frankie and Johnny, Ed, and Jeffrey) which describe various famous pioneers in the Western canon and what became of their efforts.

The Present Testament concerns the life of Harry, a kind of cynical Jesus spreading "Consolation" in the form of cocaine, with Philadelphia substituting for the Holy Lands:

- Four "gospels," (Willie, Vinnie, Ned, and Ira), the first three synoptic.
- The Book of Exploits, roughly equivalent to Acts
- The Letters to the peoples of Philadelphia (Hillites, Annenburghers, Jeffersonians, Kensingtonians, Swarthmorons, Hallites, Drexelites, Boulevardiers, Pennsylvanians, Forgers, Wharts, Mawrites, Centralian, Mallites, Mainliners, and Broadstreeters), each adopting the rhetorical style, tone, or vernacular of the corresponding constituencies
- The Book of Rationalizations, roughly equivalent to Revelation, dictated by Harry's father, Dave

After this is The Book of Harrier Brayer and The Harrier Hymnal, which correspond roughly to Book of Common Prayer and hymns.

These books were ostensibly written by a community of Punk writers during the 1970s. Surrounding them are A Punk Testament and an Epistle Dedicatory, which describes a history of and the motivation for the writing of the book. Passages in the Testaments are linked via an intercolumn reference (ICR). This may be the most important feature of the book and allows the book to be read as hypertext. There are hidden messages and puzzles in the ICR which serve as enticements to see the book in a different way, most often through in-jokes and occasional circular references.

Surrounding this are two prefaces. The Second Preface describes the quest of a former writer of UFO books to discover a true manuscript of The Boomer Bible. The First Preface is a rather scathing review of the book.

Apocryphally the incidents referenced in the "Punk Testament" are not about punk rockers, but about the events surrounding the 1985 firebombing of the MOVE house in West Philadelphia.
