= Vincent Kling (architect) =

American architect (1916–2013)

- Born: Vincent George Kling; 9 May 1916; East Orange, New Jersey, U.S.
- Died: 23 November 2013 (aged 97)
- Education: Columbia University (BA); Massachusetts Institute of Technology (MArch)
- Occupation: Architect
- Awards: Frank P. Brown Medal (1982)
- Practice: The Kling-Lindquist Partnership; KlingStubbins

Vincent George Kling (May 9, 1916 – November 23, 2013) was an American architect who co-founded the architectural practice KlingStubbins.

== Biography ==
Kling was born in East Orange, New Jersey on May 9, 1916. He was the son of a builder and joined his father's construction firm in high school. He earned his B.A. from Columbia University and M.Arch. from the Massachusetts Institute of Technology.

He enlisted in the United States Navy after the Japanese attack on Pearl Harbor and served in the Atlantic fleet's naval force until the end of war. He joined Skidmore, Owings & Merrill after the war and later set up his own practice, which became the largest architectural firm in Philadelphia. He was the principal architect and planner for Philadelphia's Penn Center.

== Notable Projects ==
- Annenberg Center for the Performing Arts
- AT&T Headquarters, Basking Ridge, New Jersey (1971-1974)
- Centre Square, Philadelphia
- Concordia University Ann Arbor campus, Ann Arbor, Michigan
- Dilworth Park, Philadelphia
- Five Penn Center, Philadelphia
- Harriton High School, Rosemont, Pennsylvania
- Lankenau Medical Center
- Love Park, Philadelphia
- Penn Center, Philadelphia
- Philadelphia Mint building
- North Shore High School, Glen Head, New York
- Reimann Building, Fox Chase Cancer Center

== Awards ==
Kling was awarded the Frank P. Brown Medal by the Franklin Institute in 1982. He was also the recipient of the Samuel F. B. Morse Medal from the National Academy of Design.
