= Elgin Park =

General information
- Type: Miniature imaginary town
- Construction started: 2008
- Owner: Michael Paul Smith

Website
- visitelginpark.com

Elgin Park was a perpetual miniature imaginary village created by artist and photographer Michael Paul Smith in 2008. It was a 1:24-scale recreation of everyday scenes from mid-20th-century America, ranging from the 1920s to the mid-1960s, based loosely on Sewickley, Pennsylvania, where Smith lived for the first seventeen years of his life. Smith, who was "founder, chief architect and mayor" of Elgin Park, photographed with his digital camera, using forced perspective, meticulously arranged scenes from the village and shared them online. Each photograph was a self-contained miniature play, meant to be viewed as a window into his memories and imagination.

== Models and photography ==
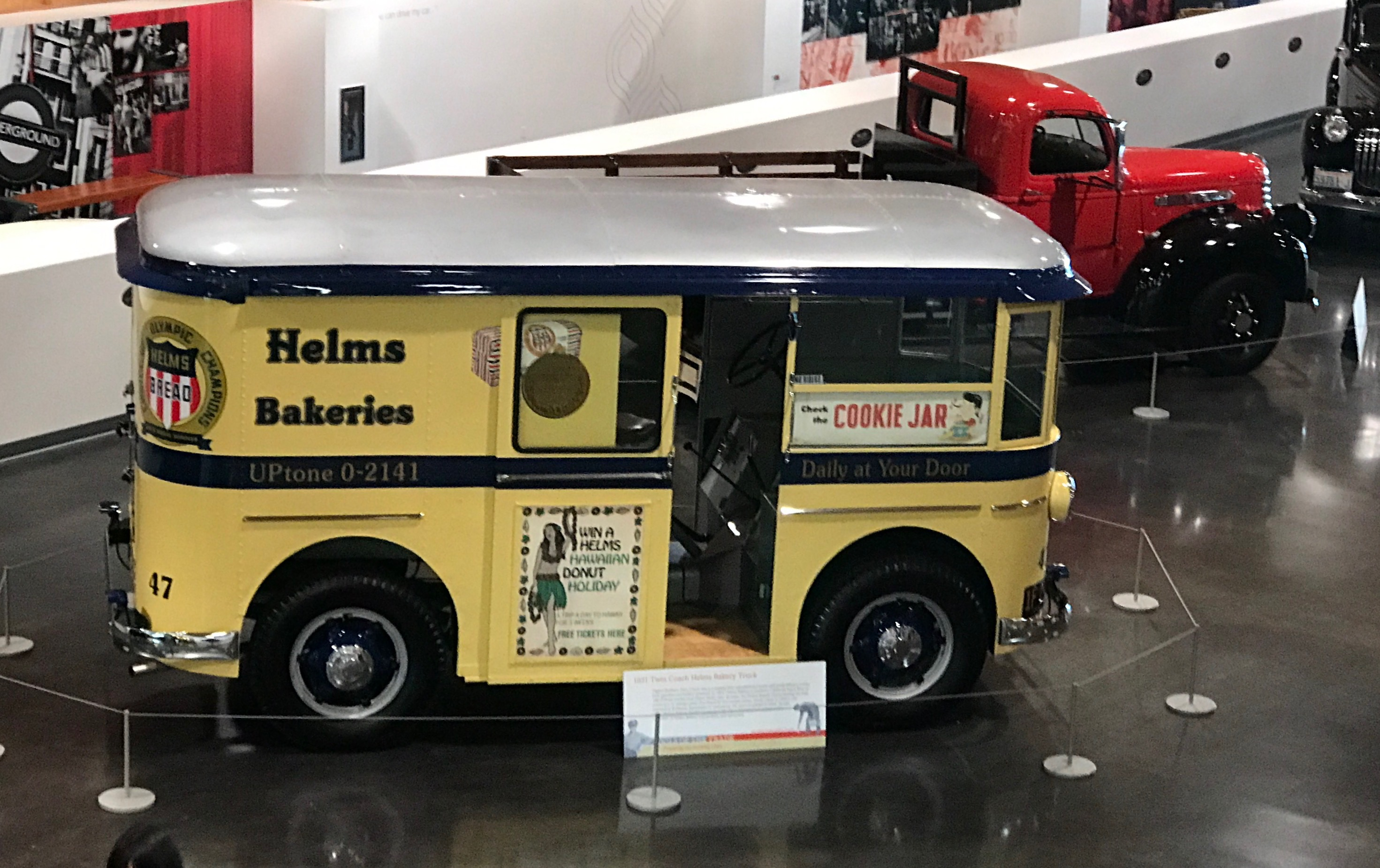
Smith used a Helms Bakery delivery truck in his set-ups. This is a full-size one, circa 1950, on display

Smith mentioned the work of photographer Charles W. Cushman as being an inspiration for his own work.

The buildings Smith used were constructed of resin-coated paper, styrene plastic and basswood. The vehicles were from his collection of over three hundred commercially produced, diecast models.

His experience as a mail carrier helped make his imaginary town as close to real as something non-existent can be. "When I was mailman, it made me aware of how streets are laid out, how towns grow. My photographs read well because there is a logic to it."

Smith's desire for authenticity meant he would put baking soda on car tires for a winter scene, or create a tiny puddle beneath an old-fashioned Divco milk float to demonstrate that blocks of ice inside it were melting as the truck sat idly at the curb. As for scaling, he said: "From the thickness of the shingles down to the wallpaper design and door knobs, everything must be in the proper relationship to each other. I can't stress that enough."

He used a series of digital cameras: a six-megapixel Sony, then a 12-megapixel Sony and finally a 14-megapixel Canon SX280.

He did not include people in his photographs, because he wanted the viewer to imagine themselves in the scenes. He also did not use Photoshop or other editing tools; the photographs were all composed in the camera.

Smith posted his first photograph in 2008, but his work did not draw much attention. In 2010, the Flickr site where he displayed those pictures went viral, after it was published in a British magazine, and within four years 74 million virtual visitors had viewed the site (20 million visited between January and March 2010 alone).

== Michael Paul Smith ==
Smith was born in 1950 in Pittsburgh, Pennsylvania, to Roy (1926–1986) and Audrey Smith (1929–2003). He grew up north of that city, in Sewickley, which became a model for his fictional one. "Elgin Park is not an exact re-creation of Sewickley," he told The New York Times in 2010, "but it does capture the mood of my memories."

For his twelfth birthday, Smith's father gave him an Aluminum Model Toys three-in-one plastic kit. It was a 1963 Chevy Impala with working headlights.

Smith was bullied in elementary school because he was gay. His family moved to Auburn, Massachusetts, when he was 17 years old. Upon graduating high school, he attended a three-year course at the Worcester Art Museum. He also enrolled briefly at the University of Massachusetts at Amherst, before getting a job with an advertising agency. He left after suffering a heart attack at the age of 33.

Moving to downtown Boston, Smith started a wallpaper and painting company, before making models for KlingStubbins architectural firm. It was at this time that he developed a hobby of collecting model miniature cars, many of them from the Franklin Mint or the Danbury Mint.

In 2010, Smith was living in Winchester, Massachusetts.

Despite his love of the aesthetics of cars, Smith did not own one for the majority of his life. A favorite that he did own, however, was a 1951 Studebaker.

In 1995, after a meeting with Larry Cultrera, Smith decided he wanted to pursue scale models.

=== Death ===
Smith died in 2018 in Reading, Massachusetts. He was 67. Per his own wish, the announcement of his death, on his Flickr site, was that he had "moved permanently to Elgin Park." Three years earlier, he said: "I needed a place that I felt comfortable in. Elgin Park is never a lonely place for me." His final words were: "It's been an interesting and sometimes fascinating trip."

Smith's longtime partner, Henry Goldberg, said Smith died from pancreatic cancer and complications of diabetes.

== Bibliography ==
- Elgin Park: An Ideal American Town, Gail K. Ellison (2011) ISBN 3791345486
- Elgin Park: Visual Memories of Midcentury America at 1/24th Scale, Gail K. Ellison (2015) ISBN 0986148903
