= Indiana Daily Student =

American newspaper

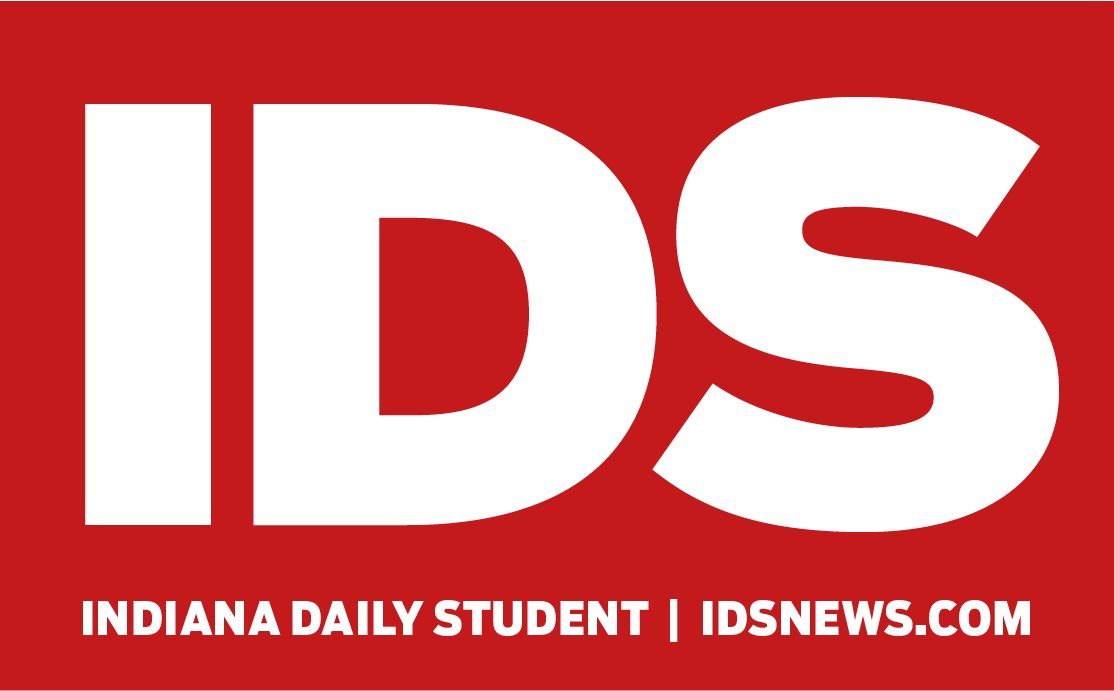
- Type: Student newspaper
- School: Indiana University
- Editor: Mia Hilkowitz, Andrew Miller
- Founded: February 22, 1867; 159 years ago
- Headquarters: Bloomington, Indiana, US
- Price: Free
- Website: idsnews.com

The Indiana Daily Student (IDS) is an independent, student-run newspaper published for the community of Indiana University Bloomington, since 1867. The IDS is free and distributed throughout the campus and city.

== Circulation ==
During the fall, spring and summer semesters, the IDS is published Thursdays and has a circulation of 9,000.

During the 2021/2022 academic year, Indiana Daily Student produced 2,579 articles, making it the seventh most prolific in the U.S. in terms of articles published.

== History ==
At its founding February 22, 1867, the paper was originally known as the Indiana Student and was published twice a month by half a dozen students. It ceased publication in 1874 due to financial difficulties but William Lowe Bryan, who was a student and would later become IU's 10th president, relaunched it in 1882. In 1897, Florence Reid Myrick became the paper's first female editor-in-chief. In 1899, the newspaper was renamed the Daily Student.

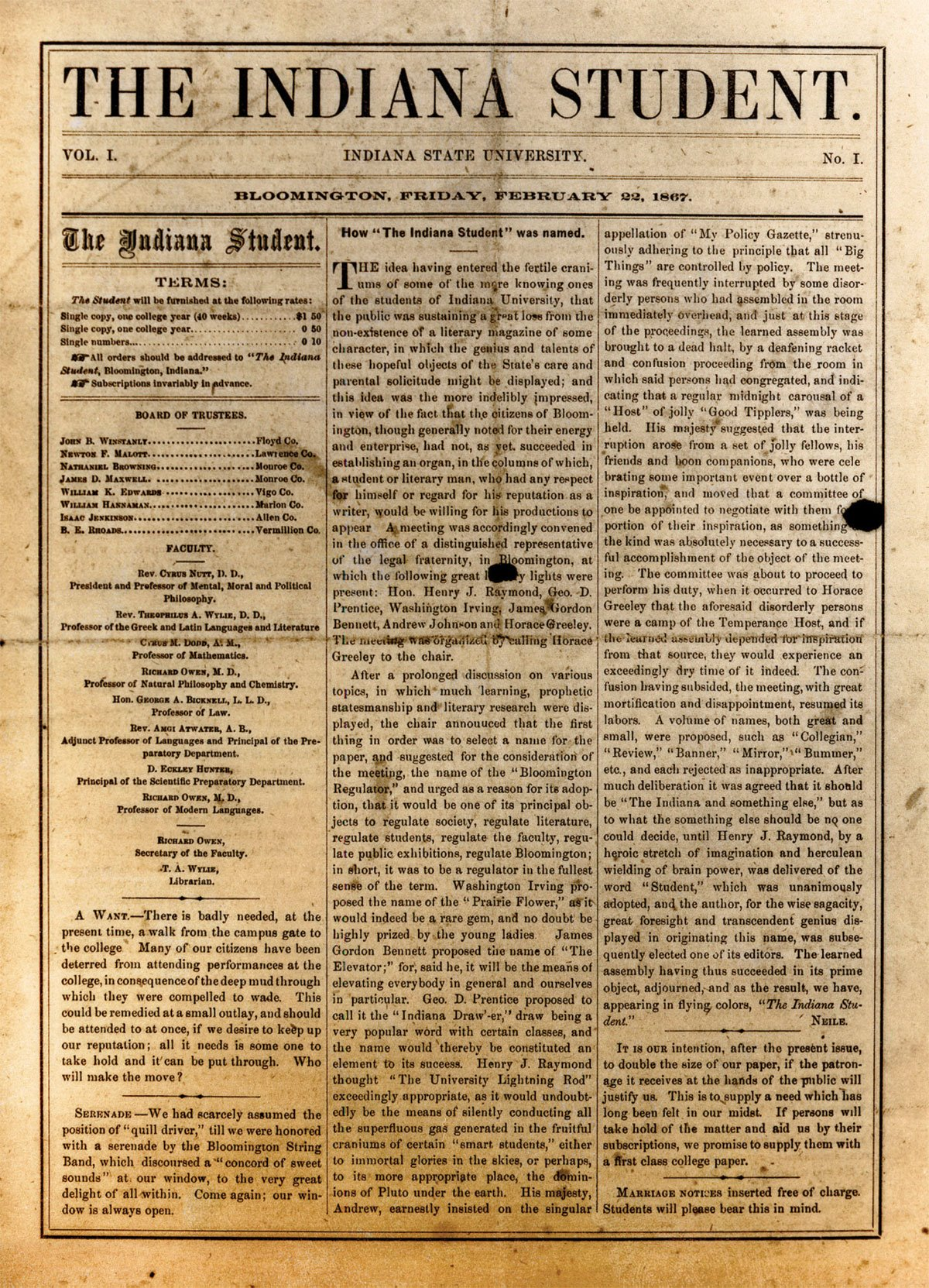
The first issue of the Indiana Daily Student, published on February 22, 1867. The IDS was first published under the name The Indiana Student

The university gained ownership of the Daily Student in 1910 and used it as a journalism lab. In 1911, the university formed the School of Journalism. That same year, the school required every journalism student to work on the paper. Students received course credit and a grade for their work. Serving as editor-in-chief required 15 credit hours, but in 1905, the position became a paid job. In 1914, the paper was renamed to its current publication title, the Indiana Daily Student.

In September 1922, Ernie Pyle became editor-in-chief and later left Indiana University a semester before graduation to work at a paper in LaPorte, Indiana.

On December 7, 1941, the IDS ran an extra on the bombing of Pearl Harbor, and is one of two known college newspapers to publish that afternoon.

The IDS moved to Ernie Pyle Hall in 1954. The building was renamed in honor of Pyle, who was shot and killed in World War II in 1945. His desk sat in the newsroom. The building was also home to the School of Journalism, until the completion of The Media School in 2014.

On July 1, 1969, the paper adopted its charter and became financially and editorially independent from the university. Journalism students were no longer required to work for the paper.

Students paid for an IDS subscription until 1973, when it became free. Due to declining revenue, the IDS began charging a quarter per issue in the spring of 1981. Up until 1995, it was only one of two college papers that still charged a fee. That fall, the IDS was once again free for students and the community. The IDS is funded exclusively through student-generated advertising and the IDS Legacy Fund.

In the summer of 1996, the IDS launched its website, the Indiana Digital Student, now known as idsnews.com

In October 2005, the IU-Bloomington Chancellor adopted a revised charter, combining the IDS and Arbutus yearbook charter, which was established in 1981, and changed the publisher's title to Director of Student Media.

In 2014, the IDS newsroom moved from Ernie Pyle Hall to the new Media School, housed in Franklin Hall on IU's campus. Pyle's desk still sits in the newsroom, near the entrance.

In 2024, students, faculty and administrators formed a committee to rework finances after yearly fiscal losses led to a total $900,000 deficit. Due to previous budget cuts, the university forced the paper to cut staff, which IDS leadership argued hurt the paper's ability to make money. However, the committee's discussions did not bear fruit. In May 2024, staff conducted a walkout to protest a lack of university support.

In November 2024, days after the 2024 United States presidential election, the IDS ran a story that highlighted negative statements about Donald Trump made by former members of his Cabinet and other allies. In response, Indiana lieutenant governor-elect Micah Beckwith, incorrectly asserting that the newspaper itself had made the statements, said in a post on X that the IDS story was "WOKE propaganda" and that "[t]his type of elitist leftist propaganda needs to stop or we will be happy to stop it for them." The IDS staff noted that Beckwith's response appeared to threaten the staff's First Amendment rights. In an email response to a request for comment from local NBC News affiliate WTHR, Beckwith said, "There were two assassination attempts on President Trump's life due to inflammatory language and illustrations like what the Indiana Daily Student published" and that he would make sure the newspaper "receives no taxpayer support directly or indirectly." The paper's co-editor in chief noted that the paper receives no taxpayer funds. Beckwith later conducted an interview with the IDS in which he said he would protect the newspaper's free speech rights if he felt the stories run by the paper were "fair".

In October 2025, Indiana University fired Jim Rodenbush, director of student media, after he refused an administration request to remove news not related to homecoming from a planned special print edition. Student editors decried what they saw as "unlawful censorship." The university subsequently ended all print editions, over the student editors' objections. The Purdue Exponent, the student newspaper at Purdue University, published a special edition covering the concern of journalistic freedom surrounding the firing and ceasing of print editions. This edition was distributed on the IU campus.

== Staff ==
The IDS employs more than 200 students; 6 professional staff members serve as advisers. The IDS is the third largest employer of students on campus.

The student editor-in-chief is selected by a publications board that includes professional journalists, student representatives, alumni, faculty and administrators. The editor changes every semester – fall, spring and summer. Once selected, the editor chooses managing editors and desk editors for the semester through an application process. Staff members are drawn from all majors, and many major in the IU Media School.

Management includes the editor-in-chief, two traditional managing editors, creative director and digital managing editor. Management chooses desk editors for the paper's news, sports, arts, opinion, photo, general assignments, design, copy, video, enterprise, digital, social media, and audience engagement sections.

New writers, photographers, page designers, copy editors and web content producers are accepted on a rolling basis. Creative, Marketing and Distribution typically hire new staffers at the end of every semester. Opinion columnists are also hired at the beginning or end of the semester. Writers are paid per story, photographers per photo assignment, designers per page they design.

Photographer Charles W. Cushman briefly worked for the newspaper in the early 20th century.

== Online ==
The Indiana Daily Student's website, idsnews.com, features all paper content in a digital format, as well as multimedia such as videos, photo galleries, and audio slideshows. The website serves as a way to release breaking news and allow readers to interact through online comments.

The IDS previously hosted a number of blogs for user forums and additional content. "Hoosier Hype" covered all IU sports. The blog launched in the fall of 2009 and aggregated content from previous sports blogs, such as "Basketblog", to include all IU athletics. The site hosts live chats during IU sports games to create a conversation between the IDS's sports staff and its readers. "Live Buzz" covered live entertainment in Bloomington with information on upcoming concerts and music venues, as well as interviews with local and visiting bands and musicians. The opinion desk's blog, "The Sample Gates", featured content from columnists and editors on current events. BlogNetNews recognizes the "Sample Gates" on its Indiana Political Blogwire. Launched in the spring of 2012, "Collegiate Brand News" was a satirical blog that features fake news and photos reflecting current events and student life at IU. The IDS photo blog, "Focus", was home to work from IDS photographers. These blogs have since been discontinued.

The IDS website hosts the podcast "Posted," a weekly recap from the IDS that shares the week's top news stories.

The IDS remains active on a number of social media channels. Their Twitter, @idsnews, shares breaking news and other online content. The Indiana Daily Student Facebook hosts a number of Facebook Groups to engage with readers. These include "Hoops: IU Basketball Fan Forum," created in 2018; "The Hub: your Little 500 Source," created in 2019, which shares content regarding the annual Little 500 bike race; and "Bloomington, IU Coronavirus Updates," created in Spring 2020 to share information regarding the coronavirus pandemic. The IDS Instagram, @idsnews, shares photos, stories and reader engagement content.

== Awards ==
Over the years, the IDS has garnered numerous national, regional and state honors. It is a consistent winner of the Associated Collegiate Press Pacemaker Award and the Columbia Scholastic Press Association Gold Crown Award. In its history, the IDS has won 41 Gold Crowns.

IDS writers won the Hearst writing competition every year from 2013 to 2019. The IDS also consistently places in the Indiana Collegiate Press Association awards, winning 70 awards in advertising, online and print content in 2020.

The IDS marketing and creative team consistently wins awards from the College Media Business and Advertising annual contest for their advertising campaigns.

The IDS is an affiliate of UWIRE.

== Distinguished alumni ==
- The famous World War II reporter and Pulitzer Prize winner Ernie Pyle served as editor-in-chief of the Indiana Daily Student in 1922.
- Washington journalist Robert E. Thompson who served in 1958 as John F. Kennedy's press secretary and covered eleven presidents as a White House Newsman served as editor-in-chief in 1949.
- Crusading editor Don Mellett served as editor-in-chief
- Golden Globe-winning TV producer and creator of Glee Ryan Murphy worked for the IDS as arts editor in the 1980s.
- Nelson Poynter, former owner of the Times Publishing Company, and the co-founder of the Congressional Quarterly, was editor-in-chief in his junior year.
- Former Baltimore Sun editor Tim Franklin served as editor-in-chief.
- Three-time Pulitzer Prize–winning photojournalist Michel du Cille was photo editor at the IDS.
- Chicago Tribune editor Gerould Kern worked at the IDS.
- Pulitzer Prize–winning narrative journalist Thomas French was editor-in-chief in 1980
- Cartoonist David Willis
