= First Interstate Tower fire =

1988 fire in Los Angeles, California

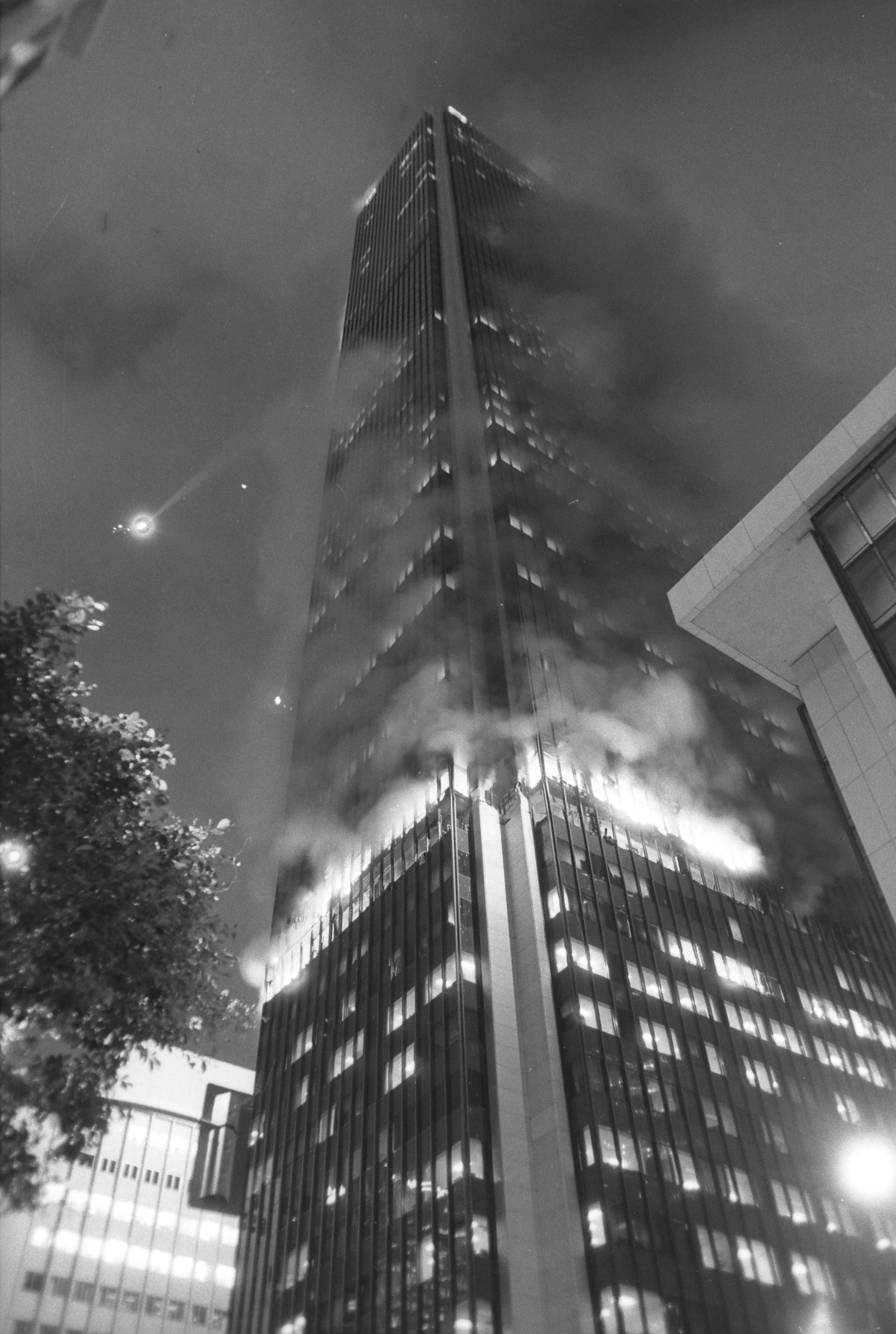
- The First Interstate Tower, with several floors burning.
- Date: May 4, 1988
- Venue: First Interstate Tower
- Location: Los Angeles, California, United States; 34°2′57.2″N 118°15′25.7″W
- Type: Fire
- Cause: electrical: harmonic distortion
- Deaths: 1
- Injuries: 40

The First Interstate Tower fire was a high-rise fire that occurred on May 4, 1988, at the First Interstate Tower in Los Angeles, California, a 62-story, 860 foot (260 m) skyscraper, then the tallest building in the city. The fire destroyed five floors of the building, injured 40 people, and caused the death of a maintenance worker, when the elevator he was riding opened onto the burning 12th floor.

== Background ==
The fire was so severe because the building was not equipped with fire sprinklers, which were not required for office towers at the time construction was completed in 1973. A sprinkler system was 90% installed at the time of the fire but was inoperative, awaiting the installation of water flow alarms.

== Fire ==
The fire originated in the southwest quadrant of the twelfth floor, in an open floor plan office area consisting of office furniture and computers. The U.S. Fire Administration report suspected the fire to be electrical in nature, but could not identify a specific cause or location. A report from NIST was also unable to determine the exact source, but agreed it likely originated in electrical equipment, and likely one of the computer workstations. The fire was first alerted around 10:22 PM on May 4, 1988 when a smoke detector on the 12th floor of the building activated. However, owing to ongoing work on the sprinkler system being installed that evening, security personnel immediately silenced the alarm, believing the activation to be a false alarm. Within six minutes, almost every smoke detector from floors 12 through 30 activated. The fire was not reported to emergency services until people outside the building called 911.

A maintenance worker, Alexander Handy, took a service elevator to the 12th floor in order to investigate the smoke detectors; however, he ultimately died when the elevator opened onto the burning 12th floor. Around 50 people were believed to be occupying the building at the time of the fire, with 37 individuals injured including 3 firefighters. Five individuals were rescued from the rooftop via helicopter.

A total of 270 firefighters from 55 different companies and 4 helicopters were all called in to fight the fire. One firefighter with the Los Angeles Fire Department told reporters: "I was not sure we could hold it" owing to the intensely hot blaze fueled by the synthetic fabrics and furnishings in the building. The fire, which resulted in $50 million worth of damage, was eventually contained at 2:19 AM.

== Aftermath ==
According to the US Fire Administration report, unusually good application of fireproofing on support members was a significant mitigating factor. The fireproofing used to protect the steel was Monokote supplied by GCP Applied Technologies (formerly W. R. Grace). Repair work took four months. Because of the fire, Los Angeles building codes were changed, requiring all high-rises to be equipped with fire sprinklers. This modified a 1974 ordinance that required only new buildings to contain fire sprinkler systems.

== Cultural references ==
The fire was dramatized in the 1991 telefilm Fire: Trapped on the 37th Floor, starring Lee Majors, Lisa Hartman Black and Peter Scolari.

== See also ==
- One Meridian Plaza – a 38-story building destroyed by fire three years later while a sprinkler system was being installed
- Andraus Fire – a 1972 fire that burned through a 32-story building in Sao Paulo, Brazil
- Joelma Fire – a 1974 fire that burned through a 25-story building in Sao Paulo, Brazil
- Minneapolis Thanksgiving Day Fire – A 1982 fire that destroyed an entire block of downtown Minneapolis, Minnesota
- 2010 Shanghai fire – destroyed a 28-story high-rise
- Lakanal House fire – a 2009 fire in a tower block in Camberwell, South London
- 2017 Plasco Building fire and collapse – in Tehran, Iran
- Grenfell Tower fire – a 14 June 2017 destruction of a London 24-story high-rise that had no sprinkler system
- PEPCON Disaster – a unrelated series of explosions, the largest being 1KT TNT equivalent, that happened in Henderson, Nevada, on the same day
