= Edmund Germer =

German inventor (1901–1987)

- Born: August 24, 1901; Berlin, Germany
- Died: August 10, 1987 (aged 85)
- Education: University of Berlin
- Occupation: Inventor

Edmund Germer (August 24, 1901 – August 10, 1987) was a German inventor, recognized as the father of the fluorescent lamp. His father was an accountant. He obtained a doctorate from the University of Berlin in lighting technology.

He applied for a patent for a fluorescent lamp with Friedrich Meyer and Hans J. Spanner on December 10, 1926, which led to U.S. patent 2,182,732. The patent was later purchased by the General Electric Company, which also licensed his patent on the high-pressure mercury-vapor lamp.

The idea of coating the tube of an arc lamp emitting in the ultraviolet with fluorescing powder to transform UV into visible light led to the realization of arc discharge emitters with spectral quality competing with incandescent emitters. Prior to that, the unpleasant color of the emitted light made these lamps unfit for daily use, despite their much higher efficiency.

He co-founded a company that worked on developing inert gas-glowing cathode rectifiers, and subsequently in the 1930s worked as an independent inventor for companies such as Osram and Philips.

After World War II, he was invited by Engelhard Industries, Newark to continue his research.

He and Hans Spanner were each awarded the Franklin Institute's Frank P. Brown Medal in 1954.
