= John W. Fisher =

John William Fisher (born February 15, 1931, in Ancell, Missouri) is a professor emeritus of civil engineering.

== Biography ==
John W. Fisher served from 1951 to 1953 in the U.S. Army Corps of Engineers, where he attained the rank of 2nd lieutenant. After graduating with a B.S. in civil engineering from Washington University in St. Louis in 1956, he became a graduate student in civil engineering at Lehigh University, where he graduated in 1958 with an M.S. From 1958 to 1961 he worked as assistant bridge research engineer working for the National Academy of Sciences in Ottawa, Illinois at the facility of the American Association of State Highway and Transportation Officials Road Test. In 1961 he returned to Lehigh University as a research assistant and graduate student, graduating with a Ph.D. in 1964. He then joined the civil engineering faculty at Lehigh University as an associate professor and was promoted to full professor in 1969, retiring as professor emeritus in 2002. He was Lehigh University's Joseph T. Stuart Professor of Engineering for almost twenty years. In 1986 he was the founding director of Lehigh University's Advanced Technology for Large Structural Systems (ATLSS) Center.

Throughout his career, Fisher has focused his research on structural connections, fatigue behavior of welded components, fracture analysis of steel structures and the behavior and performance of steel bridges. He has been published in more than 250 journals, books, and magazines, including an article titled, ""High-Performance Steels for America's Bridges," published in Welding Journal. Other publications include "Construction Technologies in Japan," in the JTEC Panel Report, "Corrosion and Its Influence on Strength of Steel Bridge Members," in the Transportation Research Record and a book titled Guide to Design Criteria for Bolted and Riveted Joints.

He was elected in 1986 a member of the National Academy of Engineering. He was named in 1987 "Construction Man of the Year" by Engineering News Record (ENR). He received in 1988 an honorary doctorate from the Swiss Federal Institute of Technology in Lausanne. He was awarded in 1992 the Franklin Institute's Frank P. Brown Medal for "forensic engineering and fatigue of materials."

In 1999, Fisher was named by ENR Magazine, the leading journal in the construction industry, as one of the "Top 125 People" of the 125 years since ENR's founding. Of Fisher, the magazine wrote, "After helping to conduct post-mortems on nearly every major failure of a steel structure, from the Hartford Civic Center to the Mianus River Bridge, Fisher campaigned for research to advance technology and prevent failures."

In 2000 he received both the Roy W. Crum Award from the Transportation Research Board and the John Fritz Medal from the American Association of Engineering Societies. From 2001 to 2002 he served on a FEMA panel of national experts that investigated the collapse of the World Trade Center following the September 11 attacks. In 2020 he received the IABSE's Award of Merit.

On October 11, 1952, in Scott County, Missouri, he married Nelda Rae Adams (born 1933). There are four children from the marriage.

== Selected publications ==
- Fisher, John William (December 1964). On the behavior of fasteners and plates with holes (PDF). Fritz Engineering Laboratory (Report). Bethlehem, PA: Lehigh University. Report 288-18.
- Grant, John A.; ——; Slutter, Roger G. (1977). "Composite beams with formed steel deck". Engineering Journal. 14 (1): 24–43. doi:10.62913/engj.v14i1.282.
- Fisher, John W. (1984). Fatigue and fracture in steel bridges. Case studies. New York: Wiley. ISBN 9780471804697.
- ——; Mertz, Dennis R. (1985). "Hundreds of bridges—thousands of cracks". Civil Engineering. 4: 64–67.
- ——; Keating, Peter B. (1989). "Distortion-induced fatigue cracking of bridge details with web gaps". Journal of Constructional Steel Research. 12 (3–4): 215–228. doi:10.1016/0143-974X(89)90056-4. ISSN 0143-974X.
- Pisharody, Suresh A.; ——; Abraham, Martin A. (1996). "Supercritical Water Oxidation of Solid Particulates". Industrial & Engineering Chemistry Research. 35 (12): 4471–4478. doi:10.1021/ie960269k. ISSN 0888-5885.
- Ricles, James M.; Mao, Changshi; Lu, Le-Wu; —— (2003). "Ductile details for welded unreinforced moment connections subject to inelastic cyclic loading". Engineering Structures. 25 (5): 667–680. Bibcode:2003EngSt..25..667R. doi:10.1016/S0141-0296(02)00176-1. ISSN 0141-0296.
- Tsakopoulos, Paul A.; —— (2003). "Full-Scale Fatigue Tests of Steel Orthotropic Decks for the Williamsburg Bridge". Journal of Bridge Engineering. 8 (5): 323–333. doi:10.1061/(ASCE)1084-0702(2003)8:5(323). ISSN 1084-0702.
- Connor, Robert J.; —— (2006). "Consistent Approach to Calculating Stresses for Fatigue Design of Welded Rib-to-Web Connections in Steel Orthotropic Bridge Decks". Journal of Bridge Engineering. 11 (5): 517–525. doi:10.1061/(ASCE)1084-0702(2006)11:5(517). ISSN 1084-0702.
- Connor, Robert J.; —— (2006). "Identifying Effective and Ineffective Retrofits for Distortion Fatigue Cracking in Steel Bridges Using Field Instrumentation". Journal of Bridge Engineering. 11 (6): 745–752. doi:10.1061/(ASCE)1084-0702(2006)11:6(745). ISSN 1084-0702.
- ——; Barsom, John M. (2016). "Evaluation of Cracking in the Rib-to-Deck Welds of the Bronx–Whitestone Bridge". Journal of Bridge Engineering. 21 (3): 04015065. doi:10.1061/(ASCE)BE.1943-5592.0000823. ISSN 1084-0702.
