= Ritz-Carlton Philadelphia =

Luxury hotel in Philadelphia

The Ritz-Carlton Philadelphia
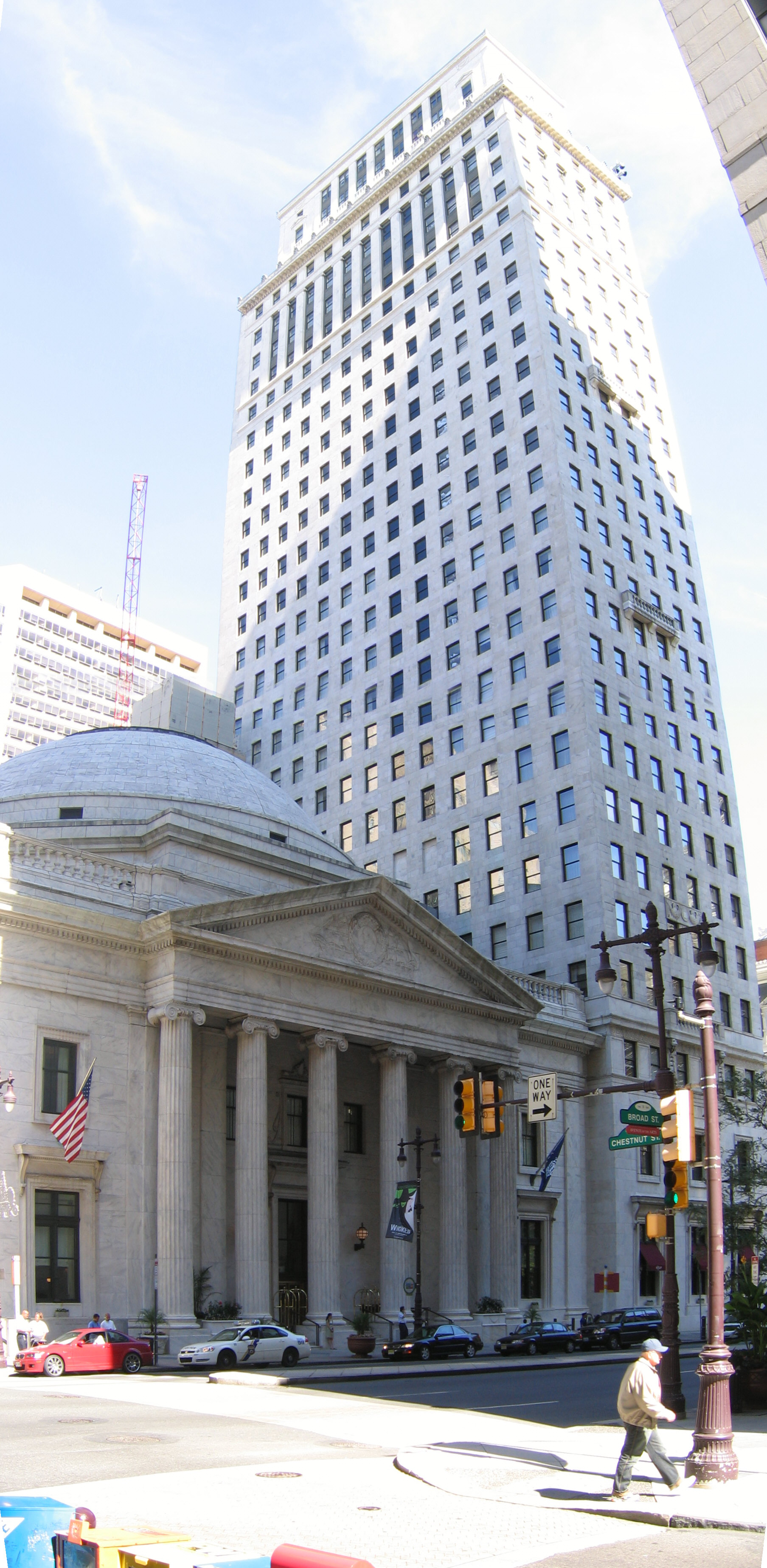

- Location within Philadelphia Ritz-Carlton Philadelphia (Pennsylvania) Ritz-Carlton Philadelphia (the United States)

General information
- Status: Completed
- Type: Hotel
- Location: 28-32 South Broad Street, Philadelphia, Pennsylvania, United States
- Coordinates: 39°57′05″N 75°09′51″W
- Opening: 1931

Height
- Roof: 394 ft (120 m)

Technical details
- Floor count: 30

Design and construction
- Architects: Furness, Evans & Co. McKim, Mead & White
- Main contractor: United Engineers & Constructors, Inc.

The Ritz-Carlton Philadelphia is a luxury hotel and residential complex that is located in Center City, Philadelphia, Pennsylvania, United States. It comprises three adjoining buildings: the Girard Trust Bank, at the northwest corner of South Broad and Chestnut Streets, the Girard Trust Building, at the southwest corner of South Broad Street and South Penn Square, and The Residences at the Ritz Carlton, at 1414 South Penn Square.

== Girard Trust Company ==
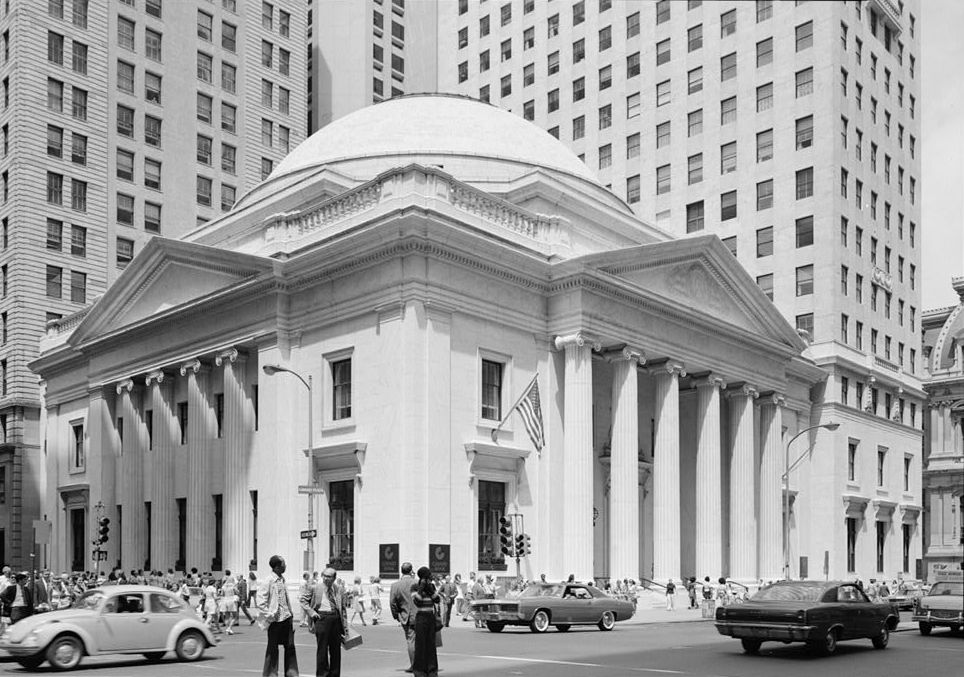
GirardTrust Corn Exchange Bank Building

Girard Trust Company – also known as the Girard Trust Corn Exchange Bank Building – was built as the headquarters and main branch of the Girard Trust Company. The company was founded in 1811.

This Beaux Arts building was inspired by the Pantheon in Rome, and was conceived by architect Frank Furness. The commission was shared between the Philadelphia firm of Furness, Evans & Company and the New York firm of McKim, Mead & White. The building was begun in 1905 and completed in 1907. The Main Banking Room is used as the hotel's restaurant and ballroom.

== Girard Trust Building ==
Girard Trust Building – also known as Girard Trust Company Office Building – is a 394-foot-tall (120 m), thirty-story skyscraper that faces City Hall. It was designed by McKim, Mead & White, and built as an office building between 1930 and 1931. It was later renamed Two Mellon Plaza.

The adjacent One Meridian Plaza (built 1972, damaged by a major fire 1991, demolished 1999) was connected to this building.

Shortly after One Meridian Plaza's demolition, the building was converted in 2000 into a 330-room Ritz-Carlton hotel. James Garrison and Dr. George C. Skarmeas were responsible for the building's conversion.

The building is located on the site formerly occupied by the West End Trust Building (1898-1928) by Furness, Evans & Company.

== The Residences at the Ritz Carlton ==
The Residences at the Ritz Carlton, which were built in 2009, stand on the former site of One Meridian Plaza.
