= Charles W. Cushman =

American photographer

- Born: July 30, 1896; Poseyville, Indiana, U.S.
- Died: June 8, 1972 (aged 75); San Francisco, California, U.S.
- Resting place: Cypress Lawn Memorial Park, Colma, California, U.S.
- Known for: Photography

Charles Weever Cushman (July 30, 1896 – June 8, 1972) was an American photographer, active during the early and mid-20th century. He left around 14,500 images from his collection to Indiana University.

== Early life ==
Cushman was born in Poseyville, Indiana, in 1896 to Wilbur and Mabel Cushman. A younger sister, Dorothy, died at the age of two. The family lived on Second Street, in a house which was still standing in the early 21st century. Cushman's maternal great-grandfather, Charles Weever, was a native of Maine who established a medical practice in Posey County, Indiana.

Cushman graduated from Poseyville High School in 1913 and Indiana University Bloomington in 1917 with a Bachelor of Arts (A.B.) in English. He enlisted in the United States Navy Auxiliary Reserve Force at Municipal Pier in Chicago, Illinois, on May 18, 1918.

== Career ==
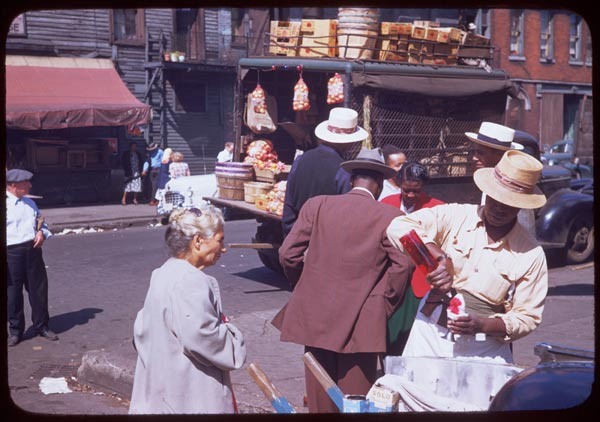
Cushman's photograph taken on Maxwell Street, Chicago, on Labor Day in 1950

Cushman worked briefly for the Indiana Daily Student newspaper. He went on to become a financial analyst.

He began working in color photography when Kodak introduced Kodachrome. His first color image, taken on September 3, 1938, featured a red Ford coupe, with the Golden Gate Bridge forming a backdrop. A silhouette was cast by his wife, who was sat in the passenger seat.

== Personal life ==
Cushman married Jean Hamilton. They lived in Chicago firstly, then in San Francisco. In 1943, after the death of her father, Jean attempted suicide. She was not successful, but their marriage was an unhappy one thereafter.

== Death ==
Cushman died in 1972, aged 75. He had been a widower for three years. He bequeathed his collection of around 14,500 photographs to his alma mater. The collection, which also contains 25 of his notebooks, was forgotten about for almost thirty years, until an archivist discovered them in suitcases labeled for disposal. They were displayed for the first time in 2003.

== Bibliography ==
In 2012, Oxford University Press published The Day In Its Color: Charles Cushman's Photography Journey Through a Vanishing America. Its author was Eric Sandweiss.

== See also ==
- Elgin Park, which was inspired by the work of Cushman
