= Girard Bank =

Philadelphia-based bank

- Industry: Retail bank
- Predecessor: The Girard National Bank; Stephen Girard's Bank
- Defunct: 1983
- Fate: Acquired by Mellon Bank in 1983
- Successor: Mellon Bank (East), Citizens Bank
- Headquarters: Philadelphia, Pennsylvania, United States
- Products: Financial services

Girard Bank was a Philadelphia-based bank founded after the death of Stephen Girard in 1831 by local merchants eager to trade on the sterling reputation of their namesake. Stephen Girard neither founded the bank, nor had any financial ties to the bank that bore his name. The bank was acquired by Mellon Bank in 1983 and then, two decades later, by Citizens Bank.

== Founding and early history ==
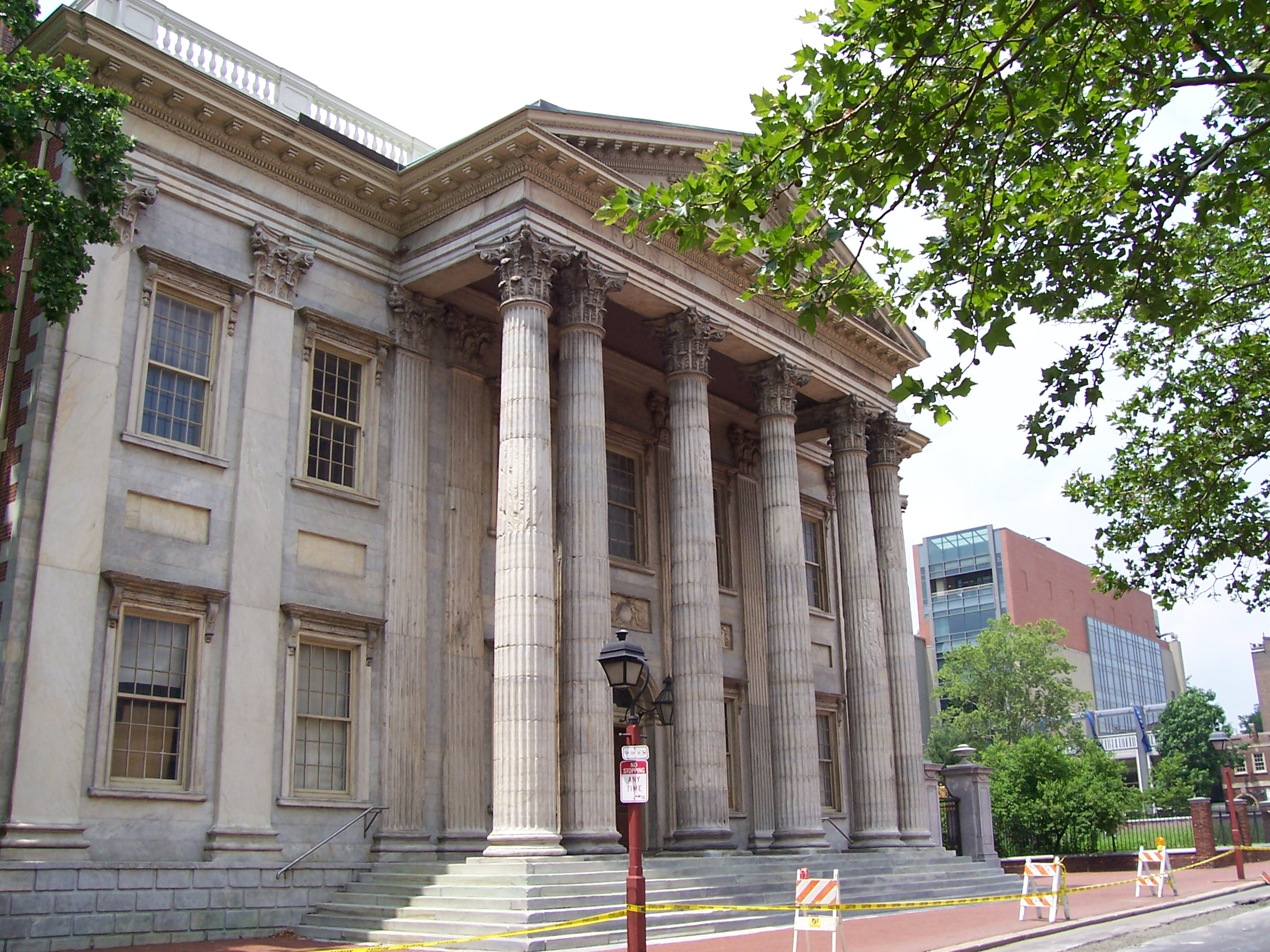
First Bank of the United States, Philadelphia, Pennsylvania. It later housed the Girard Bank.

After the charter for the First Bank of the United States expired in 1811, Stephen Girard purchased most of its stock and its facilities on South Third Street in Philadelphia, then reorganized it under his direct personal control. He hired George Simpson, the cashier of the First Bank, as cashier of the new bank, and with seven other employees, opened for business on May 18, 1812. He allowed the Trustees of the First Bank of the United States to use some offices and space in the vaults to continue the process of winding down the affairs of the closed bank at a very nominal rent. Although Pennsylvania law prohibited an association of individuals from banking without a charter, it made no such prohibition on a single individual doing so. Philadelphia banks balked at accepting the notes that Girard issued on his personal credit and lobbied the state to force him to incorporate, without success.

Girard's Bank was the principal source of government credit during the War of 1812. Towards the end of the war, when the financial credit of the U.S. government was at its lowest, Girard placed nearly all of his resources at the disposal of the government and underwrote up to 95 percent of the war loan issue, which enabled the United States to carry on the war.

After the war, Girard became a large stockholder in and one of the directors of the Second Bank of the United States. Upon his death in 1831, his own bank passed to a trust according to his will. Merchants of the city chartered the Girard Bank to buy the banking assets from the trust and carry on the business. Ironically, in view of its history, Girard Bank was one of the pet banks to which Treasury Secretary Roger B. Taney transferred the government's Pennsylvania deposits in the Second Bank of the United States. After the passage of the National Banking Act, the bank reorganized in 1863 as Girard National Bank.

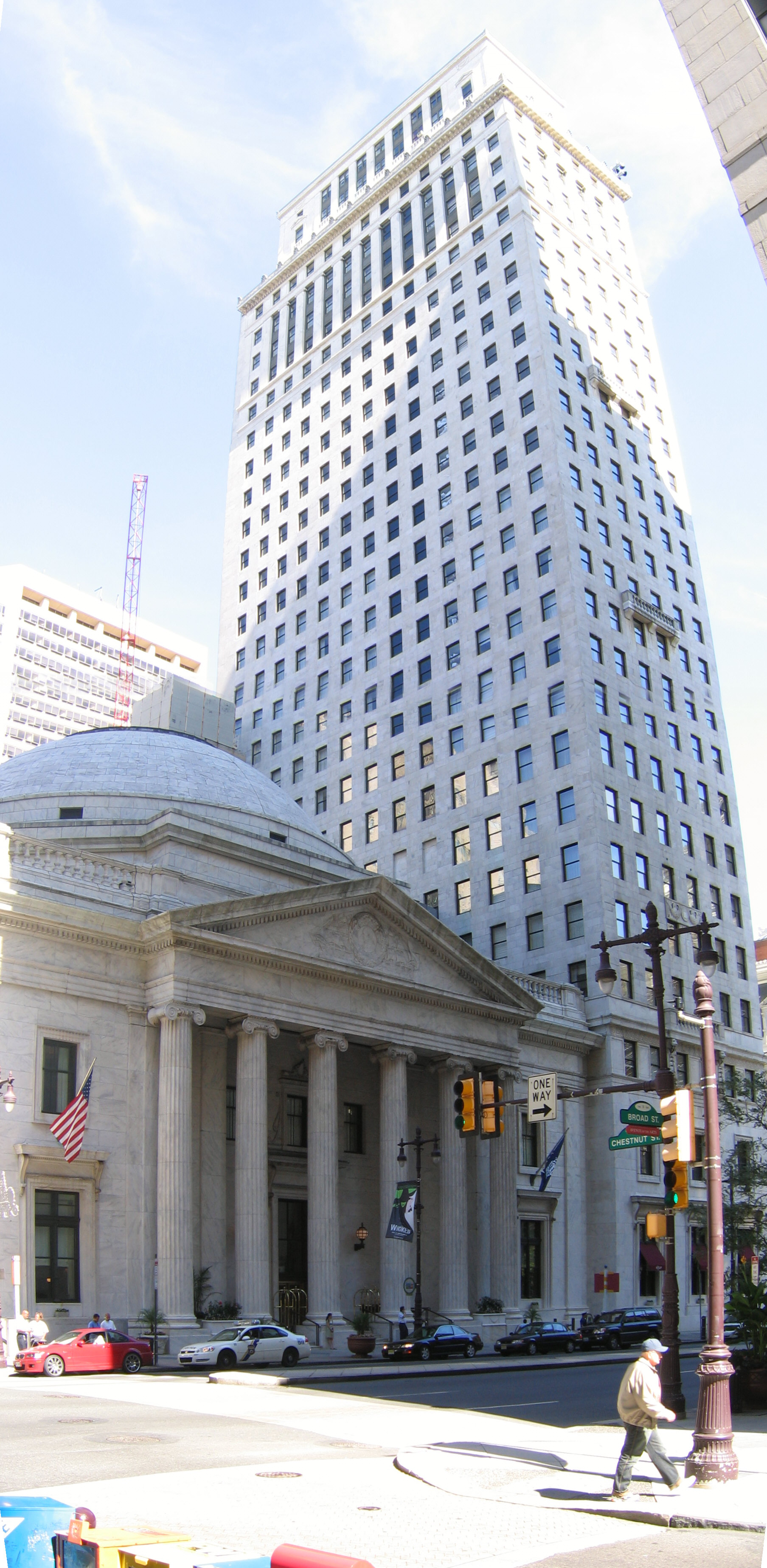
Girard Trust Building, constructed 1907-08 on Broad Street in Philadelphia, today The Ritz-Carlton Philadelphia Hotel

In February 1903, Girard Bank acquired the business of the Mechanics National Bank. Five years later it constructed a new headquarters on Broad Street, known as the Girard Trust Building, designed by Frank Furness. In 1930, the bank began construction of a new tower adjoining the domed 1908 building, designed by McKim, Mead & White and completed in 1931. The tower was located on the site formerly occupied by the West End Trust Building (1898-1928). The 1908 domed building today serves as The Ritz-Carlton Philadelphia hotel.

== Acquisition of Corn Exchange Bank ==
In 1952, Girard Trust Company acquired The Corn Exchange Bank's Philadelphia branches, and renamed itself Girard Trust Corn Exchange Bank. From 1964 to 1971, the bank was known as Girard Trust Bank, later Girard Bank.

== Acquisition by Mellon Bank ==
Girard merged with Mellon Bank in 1983, in a deal valued at $220 million, following a change in Pennsylvania law that allowed local banks to operate statewide (technically, allowing bank holding companies to own multiple banks). Following the acquisition, the bank was immediately renamed Mellon Bank (East). The century-old Girard lost its corporate identity, creating integration issues between Mellon and Girard's employees and customers. The bank was largely sold to Citizens Bank two decades later. Its monumental headquarters building, today a Ritz hotel, still stands at Broad and Chestnut Streets in Philadelphia.

In the 1970s, Girard became one of the pioneers of automated banking, launching a proprietary network of automated teller machines in 1978 known as "George". In response, Philadelphia National Bank (PNB) launched its own network of ATMs, the precursor of the MAC system in 1979 with the support of 13 other financial institutions. After Girard's acquisition in 1983, Mellon Bank joined the MAC network.

== See also ==
- Stephen Simpson, former employee at Girard's bank and author of the book Biography of Stephen Girard, with His Will Affixed (1832), a very critical account of Girard and his bank.

Bibliography

- The history of the Girard National Bank of Philadelphia, 1832-1902 Printed by J. B. Lippincott Co., 1902
- Girard Trust Company: a century of financial activity, 1836-1936. E. Stern & Co., inc., 1936
- "Girard National of Philadelphia Has Acquired the Independence National". The New York Times. April 3, 1901.
- Girard Trust Corn Exchange Bank
