= KlingStubbins =

American architectural firm

- Type: Corporation
- Industry: Architecture, Engineering, Interiors, Landscape, Planning
- Founded: 1946; 80 years ago
- Founder: Vincent G. Kling; Hugh Stubbins
- Headquarters: 2301 Chestnut Street; Philadelphia, Pennsylvania
- Key people: Michael Lorenz (National Managing Principal)
- Number of employees: ~500 people
- Parent: Jacobs Engineering Group
- Website: www.klingstubbins.com

KlingStubbins was an architectural, engineering, interior, and planning firm headquartered in Philadelphia, with offices in Cambridge, Massachusetts; Raleigh, North Carolina; San Francisco; Washington, D.C.; and Beijing. In 1982, the Franklin Institute awarded Vincent G. Kling the Frank P. Brown Medal.

== Firm history ==
KlingStubbins was formed through the merger of two offices in 2007. The first, The Kling-Lindquist Partnership, Inc., was founded by Vincent Kling (1916–2013) in 1946, and grew to become the largest firm in Philadelphia. One of the most recognizable buildings designed by Kling is the Bell Atlantic Tower, which was completed in 1991 and remains among the tallest buildings in Philadelphia. Kling also collaborated with Philadelphia city planner Edmund Bacon.

The Stubbins Associates was founded by Hugh Stubbins, FAIA, in 1949 and based in Cambridge, Massachusetts. Hugh Stubbins had designed several of the world's most noted skyscrapers, including the Citicorp Center in New York City; the Federal Reserve Bank of Boston headquarters in Boston; and the Yokohama Landmark Tower, the tallest building in Japan. Kling became affiliated with The Stubbins Associates in 2003, and the two officially merged on January 1, 2007. The company grew to include engineering, interior design, landscape architecture, and several branch offices in other cities.

Michael Paul Smith, later founder of the popular Elgin Park miniature imaginary village, worked for the company as model maker in the 1970s.

In 2011, KlingStubbins was acquired by Jacobs Engineering Group and operates as part of their Global Buildings sector.

== Notable designs ==
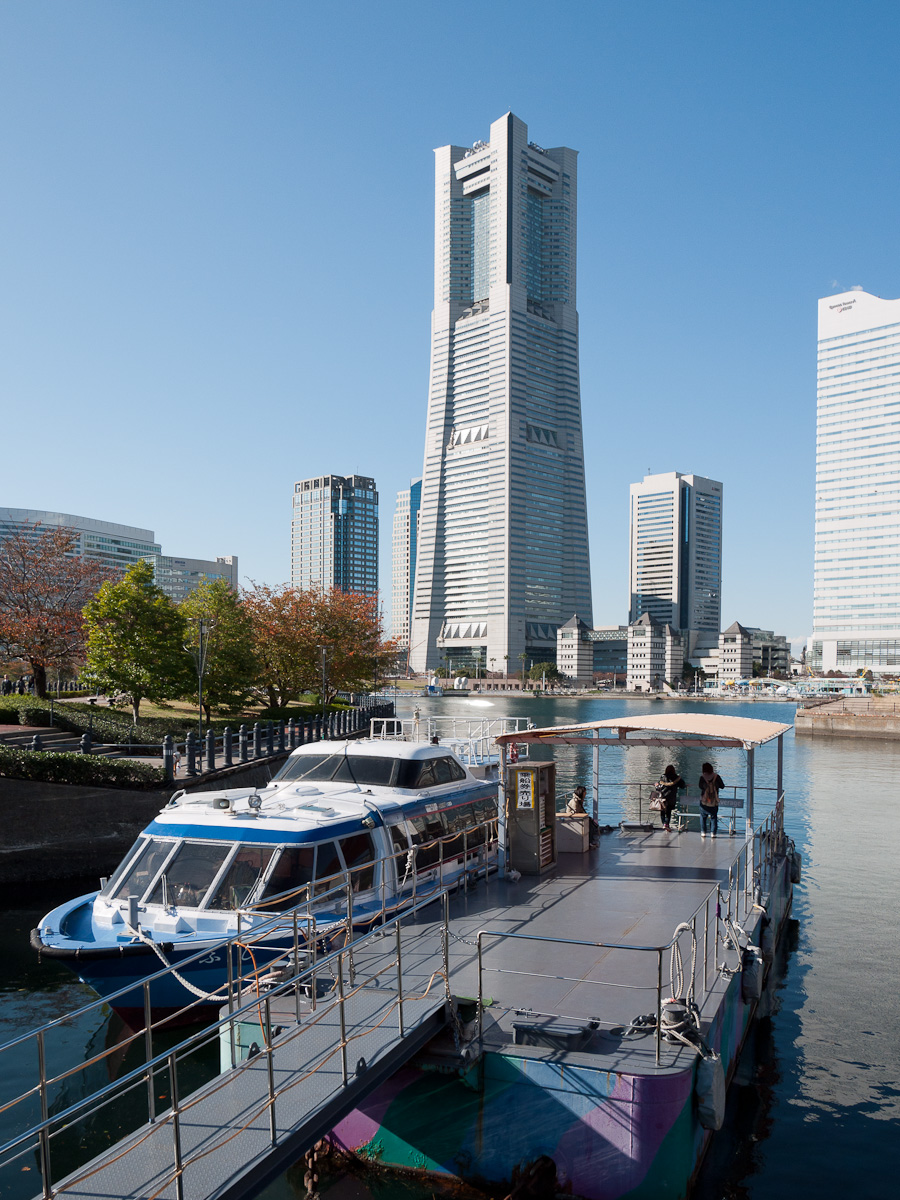
Yokohama Landmark Tower

- Campbell's Employee Center, Camden, New Jersey, 2010
- Autodesk AEC Headquarters, Waltham, Massachusetts, 2008
- AT&T Headquarters Basking Ridge, New Jersey (1971-1974)
- United States Postal Service Processing & Distribution Center, Philadelphia, 2006
- Merck Research Laboratories Boston, 2005
- University of Colorado Health Sciences Center Research Complex I, Aurora, Colorado, 2005
- The Venetian Resort, Las Vegas, USA, 2003
- Wyeth Headquarters Phase II, Collegeville, Pennsylvania
- Bell Atlantic Tower, Philadelphia, 1991
- Penn Center, Philadelphia, 1950s
- GlaxoSmithKline Pharmaceutical R&D Headquarters Complex, Research Triangle Park, North Carolina
- Dow Jones & Company Corporate Office Facility, Princeton, New Jersey
- SAP AG America Corporate Headquarters, Newtown Square, Pennsylvania
- International Monetary Fund Headquarters (Phases I, 2 and 3), Washington, DC 1971–1999
- Congress Hall, Berlin
- Yokohama Landmark Tower, Yokohama, Japan
- Lankenau Medical Center, Wynnewood, Pennsylvania
- Veterans Stadium, Philadelphia
- Citigroup Center, New York City
- North Shore High School, Glen Head, New York
- Ronald Reagan Presidential Library, Simi Valley, California
- One Cleveland Center, Cleveland
- Federal Reserve Bank of Boston
- PacWest Center, Portland, Oregon
- Salesforce Tower, Indianapolis
- Nashville City Center, Nashville, Tennessee

== Publications ==
Both The Stubbins Associates and Kling-Lindquist have published several architectural monographs. Their first combined volume, KlingStubbins: Palimpsest, was published in 2009 by Images Publishing. Drawing on several years of in-house research on laboratory design, KlingStubbins published a design reference book, Sustainable Design of Research Laboratories: Planning, Design, and Operation, through Wiley in 2010, which examines inter-disciplinary design strategies for sustainable design and energy efficiency in the design and operation of research laboratories.

== Project delivery innovation ==
With their Autodesk Headquarters in Waltham, MA, KlingStubbins became the first architectural firm in New England to employ an Integrated Project Delivery (IPD) model. As opposed to traditional project delivery methods in which a project owner employs an architect/engineering team for design services and a contractor team for building services on separate contracts, IPD requires the owner, architect, and builder to sign a shared contract, expediting the design/building process and sharing both liability and profits among the three parties. The project garnered international recognition for the design but also for the novelty of its project structure, which resulted in a significantly faster project schedule, no legal disputes among the various parties, and no change orders on the construction site.

== Honors and awards ==
- Autodesk AEC Headquarters, Waltham, MA, USA, 2008
- Kling elected into the National Academy of Design, 1964
