= Frank P. Brown Medal =

The Frank P. Brown Medal was formerly awarded by the Franklin Institute for excellence in science, engineering, and structures. It was established by the 1938 will of Franklin Pierce Brown, a member of the Master Plumbers Association.

The designer of the medal was Walker Kirtland Hancock.

== Laureates ==
- 1941 – Willis Haviland Carrier Engineering
- 1942 – Duff Andrew Abrams Engineering
- 1943 – Albert Kahn Engineering
- 1944 – Harvey Clayton Rentschler Engineering
- 1945 – David Gilmore Clarke Engineering
- 1946 – Karl Terzaghi Earth Science
- 1947 – Karl P. Billner Engineering
- 1950 – Gustave Magnel Engineering
- 1950 – Eugene Freyssinet Engineering
- 1951 – Samuel Arnold Greeley Civil Engineering
- 1952 – Fred N. Severud Engineering
- 1953 – Frank Lloyd Wright Engineering
- 1954 – Edmund Germer Engineering
- 1954 – Hans J. Spanner Engineering
- 1954 – Humboldt W. Leverenz Engineering
- 1955 – Charles S. Leopold Engineering
- 1956 – Robert G. Letourneau Engineering
- 1957 - Pier Luigi Nervi Engineering
- 1958 - Charles Milton Spofford Engineering (author of The Theory of Structures 1915)
- 1959 - Hardy Cross Engineering
- 1960 - Richard Buckminster Fuller Engineering
- 1961 - Charles Edouard Jeanneret LeCorbusier Engineering
- 1962 - Edmund Norwood Bacon Civil Engineering
- 1964 - Louis I. Kahn Engineering
- 1965 - William Jaird Levitt Engineering
- 1966 - Bolt, Beranek and Newman, Inc. Engineering
- 1967 - Carl Koch (architect) Engineering
- 1968 - Philip Newell Youtz Engineering
- 1970 - Trevor Lloyd Wadley Engineering
- 1971 - Henry Lee Willet Engineering
- 1974 - Hans Liebherr Engineering
- 1975 - Public Building Services of U.S. Govt Engineering
- 1976 - E. Dale Waters Engineering
- 1978 - Henry J. Degenkolb Engineering
- 1982 - Vincent G. Kling Engineering
- 1982 - Lynn S. Beedle Engineering
- 1987 - Paul Weidlinger Engineering
- 1988 - Ben C. Gerwick, Jr. Engineering
- 1988 - Marvin A. Mass Engineering
- 1992 – John W. Fisher Engineering
- 1995 – Jean M. Muller Engineering
- Now dormant as an award. The last Frank P. Brown Medal was awarded in 1995.

== See also ==
- List of engineering awards
