= The Residences at The Ritz-Carlton (Philadelphia) =

Residential skyscraper in Philadelphia, Pennsylvania

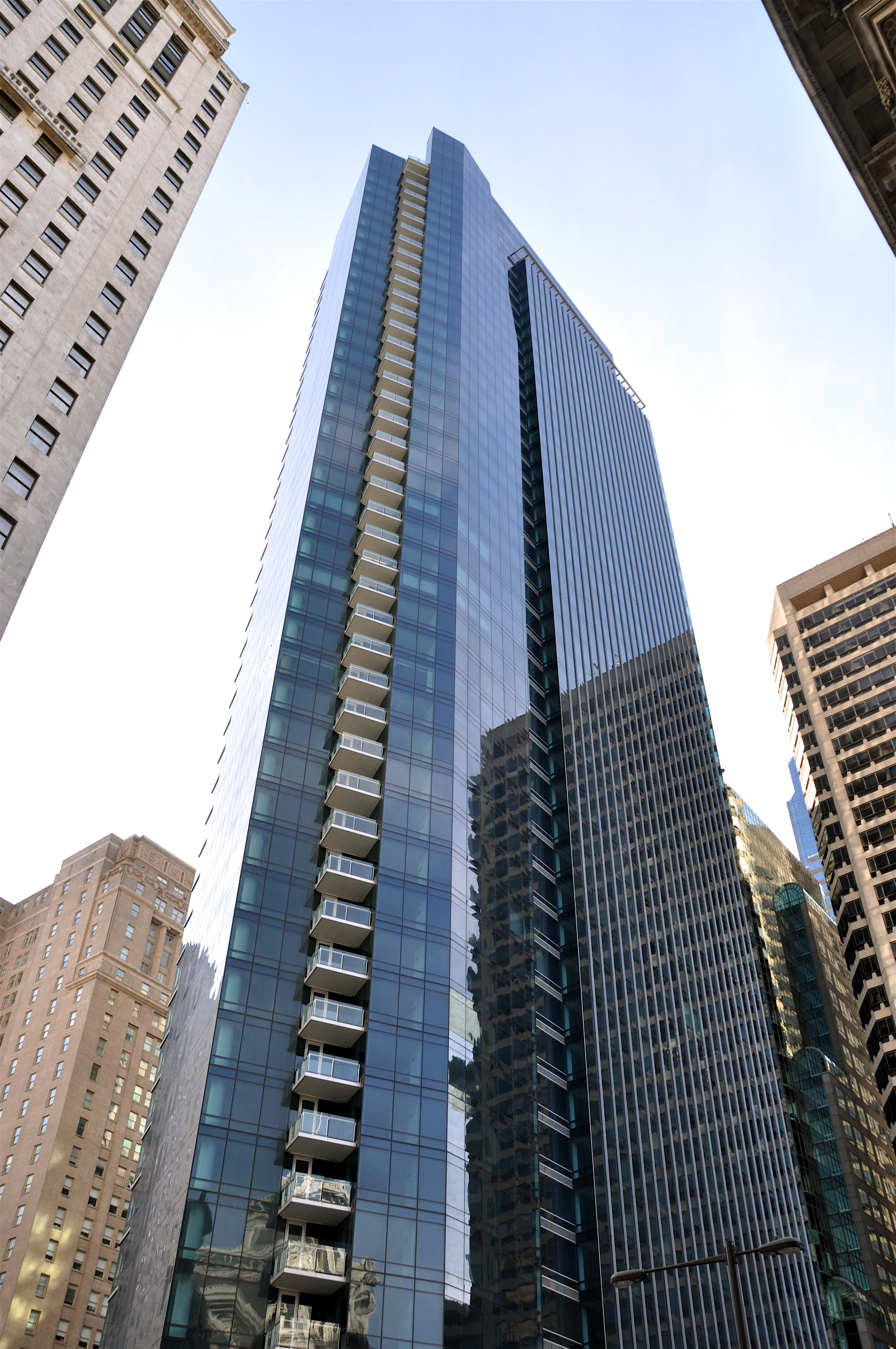
- The Residences at The Ritz-Carlton in 2009.

- Location within Philadelphia Location within Pennsylvania Location within the United States

General information
- Status: Completed
- Type: Residential
- Location: 1414 South Penn Square, Philadelphia, Pennsylvania, U.S.
- Coordinates: 39°57′5″N 75°9′53″W
- Construction started: 2006
- Opening: 2009
- Cost: US$285 million
- Owner: AGC Partners, LC and Gencom Group

Height
- Roof: 518 feet (158 m)

Technical details
- Floor count: 48
- Floor area: 617,665 sq ft (57,383.0 m^{2})

Design and construction
- Architect: Handel Architects
- Developer: Arden Group
- Main contractor: L. F. Driscoll Company

The Residences at The Ritz-Carlton is a luxury residential skyscraper in Center City in Philadelphia, Pennsylvania, United States. Designed by Handel Architects, the skyscraper is 518 feet (158 m) with 48 stories. It is the 15th-tallest building in Philadelphia as of 2025.

The building was erected on the former site of One Meridian Plaza which was seriously damaged by a deadly fire in 1991. One Meridian Plaza was demolished in 1999 and the property was sold by E/R Partners to the Arden Group the next year. Development of the site by the Arden Group, which owns the adjacent Ritz-Carlton Philadelphia, was delayed for years as a result of a feud with rival developer Mariner Commercial Properties. Mariner owned the property 1441 Chestnut Street, which sits south of the Residences at The Ritz-Carlton site and intends to build its own residential tower. The feud began after Arden Group's lead partner Craig Spencer blocked approval of 1441 Chestnut Street because he felt the tower's design would be detrimental to the planned Residences at The Ritz-Carlton tower. This led to several years of dispute between the developers trying to block construction of each other's towers.

After several redesigns, the feud was declared over, and construction on the Residences at The Ritz-Carlton began on May 2, 2006. The blue glass skyscraper opened to residents in January 2009. The Residences at The Ritz-Carlton features 270 condominiums and penthouses, which range in price from $550,000 to $14 million. The high-rise also features an underground parking garage, a fitness center, a pool, a private garden, and a public plaza called Girard Park.

== History ==
=== Background ===
The Residences at the Ritz-Carlton stands on the former site of the 38-story One Meridian Plaza. In February 1991, One Meridian Plaza was severely damaged by a fire that destroyed eight floors and killed three firefighters. Due to litigation over the fate of the burned skyscraper, it sat vacant for eight years, being demolished in 1999. Adjacent to One Meridian Plaza was Two Mellon Plaza, which had been damaged and vacant since the One Meridian Plaza fire; the Arden Group acquired that building and converted into a Ritz-Carlton hotel, which opened in 2000. South of the One Meridian Plaza site, Mariner Commercial Properties bought several properties for $11.2 million and razed them for another $2 million. The north side of the One Meridian Plaza site faces Philadelphia City Hall, situated across the street.

One Meridian Plaza's owner E/R Partners settled a long-running lawsuit with its insurer in March 1997, allowing E/R Partners to partially demolish that building. E/R Partners initially wanted to demolish only the heavily-damaged upper half of One Meridian Plaza, with plans to resell the lower half, but with no potential buyers being identified by late 1998, E/R indicated that it would destroy the bottom half as well. The Arden Group expressed interest in the site, offering to buy it for $13 million in September 1998. The next month, Arden sued E/R Partners, alleging that it had breached contract by offering to sell the site to Liberty Property Trust for a higher amount. In 2000, the Arden Group settled with E/R Partners, agreeing to pay more than $13 million for the site, with intentions to develop a mixed-use building there. Instead, the site was instead initially used as parking; at the time, there was low demand for new skyscrapers in Center City.

=== Development ===
By 2001, Arden wanted to develop an office building for Comcast; however, the site was only 22,000 square feet (2,000 m^{2}), whereas Comcast wanted to have 33,000 square feet (3,100 m^{2}) on each floor. Mariner, which owned a similarly-sized site, also wanted to design a building for Comcast, hiring Kling Inc. to design that structure; this would have required taking over Arden's land. Comcast suggested that the two sites be combined. Arden Group chief executive Craig Spencer and Mariner chief executive Tim Mahoney were unable to agree, and eventually Comcast put its office-tower plans on hold. Mariner later suggested a 615-foot-tall (187 m) structure designed by Cope Linder Architects, with 428 apartments.

==== Design ====
The competing proposals turned into a years-long feud between Spencer and Mahoney. In 2002, Spencer obtained a zoning variance to prevent Mariner's 50-story tower from being built. Early the next year, Mahoney received permission for his tower from the City Zoning Board of Adjustment; Spencer appealed the ruling, saying that Mahoney's building would block views and cast shadows on Spencer's site. Mahoney, in turn, threatened to block Spencer's own building, which was tentatively supposed to include condominium apartments and a health club. Spencer filed a lawsuit to block construction of the building, and a Court of Common Pleas ruled that the Zoning Board erred in approving 1441 Chestnut Street.

In 2004, Spencer and Mahoney announced that the feud was over and that plans for both towers would move forward. Spencer announced that Arden would build a 740 feet (230 m), 57-story luxury condominium tower called The Residences at The Ritz-Carlton. The Residences at The Ritz-Carlton would be more than 100 feet (30 m) taller than the skyscraper Spencer criticized as too tall in 2003. The bulky floors were designed to contain a grand ballroom, health club, and 540-car parking garage. The feud quickly reignited when Mahoney criticized the design of The Residences at The Ritz-Carlton's lower floors, saying it would lower the value of his own building's lowest 21 floors. Further redesigns to both buildings prevented any condominiums from facing a garage. The feud continued with lively arguments to block each other plans in courtrooms and Philadelphia city agencies. Chairman of the zoning board, David L. Auspitz, called the feud the "Super Bowl of zoning battles".

In July 2005, Spencer announced a redesign of The Residences at The Ritz-Carlton shrinking the building from 57 floors to 44 floors. Among the facilities removed in the redesign were the ballroom and some of the parking. Afraid the high-rise would miss the city's hot condominium market, the redesign sidestepped the legal challenges because it would not need special approval by the Zoning Board to exceed a certain height. Mahoney vowed to continue fighting the building saying "If [Spencer] needs so much as a curb-cut permit, we're going to block it."

==== Construction and opening ====
Gencom Group and Colgate Development agreed to partner with Arden in the building's development. Construction began on May 2, 2006 with a ceremony that featured Pennsylvania Governor Ed Rendell. By September 2006, one-third of the building's units had been sold. The tower had been built as far as the fifth floor by May 2007, at which point 40% of the apartments were in contract to be sold. The Multi-Housing News said that the building had sold $100 million worth of residences in a shorter time period than any other building in the city. The concrete superstructure was poured at a rate of one story every four days, and workers used a formwork that raised itself as construction proceeded.

The Residences at The Ritz-Carlton was topped off in July 2008, and the high-rise opened for residents on January 13, 2009. In March 2009, Mahoney and Spencer reached an agreement that ended all legal challenges between the buildings. Now at 48 stories, The Residences at The Ritz-Carlton was far enough from Mahoney's 1441 Chestnut Street that 1441 Chestnut Street had views of Philadelphia City Hall, while the 58-story 1441 Chestnut Street upper portion was redesigned in a way that allowed views on the south side of The Residences at The Ritz-Carlton.

The skyscraper was officially dedicated with a ceremony on June 8, 2009. In total, the structure is variously cited as having cost $285 million or $300 million. Among the tower's early residents was the basketball player Ben Simmons. Another early resident was the chef Eric Ripert, who operated the nearby Ritz-Carlton Hotel's 10 Arts restaurant until 2012. By 2021, only four of the residences remained unsold.

== Architecture ==
The Residences at The Ritz-Carlton is a 45-story, 518 ft (158 m) tall residential skyscraper designed by Handel Architects. Also involved in the building's construction were general contractor L.F. Driscoll, structural engineer Thornton Tomasetti, mechanical engineer Flack & Kurtz, and civil engineer Pennoni Associates. The skyscraper is the 15th tallest building in Philadelphia as of 2025.

The Residences at The Ritz-Carlton has a blue glass curtain wall and the east side of the building is pointed allowing views of Philadelphia City Hall. The curtain wall was built by Enclos, which ordered the curtain wall from China due to the delays and increased costs that would have resulted if curtain-wall panels were obtained from an American firm. Between the Residences at The Ritz-Carlton and the Ritz-Carlton Hotel is Girard Park. Girard Park is split into a gated garden for residents and a public space facing the street. A memorial for the three firefighters who died during the One Meridian Plaza fire was unveiled on October 21, 2009. Designed by the Philadelphia Fire Department, the memorial is located by the building's entrance and contains the firefighters' names on plaques.

=== Interior ===
The interior covers 628,000 square feet (58,300 m^{2}). The lower stories have a concrete-and-steel superstructure with 49 girders at the third floor, which weigh a total of 733 short tons (654 long tons; 665 t). The rest of the building has a concrete superstructure. The building's amenities include hotel services, a fitness club, and a 60 feet (18 m) lap pool. The lobby features a restaurant named 10 Arts.

The building features 270 one- to three-bedroom condominiums and penthouses that range between 890 square feet (83 m^{2}) to 2,045 square feet (190 m^{2}). The one-to three-bedroom apartments originally ranged in price from approximately $550,000 to $12 million. Each of the units has built-in kitchen appliances, as well as marble bathrooms. The 46th-floor penthouse covers 10,000 square feet (930 m^{2}), with five bedrooms and several outdoor terraces. Immediately above it is another five-bedroom penthouse with a terrace wrapping around two sides of the building.

== Reception ==
The Philadelphia Inquirer architecture critic Inga Saffron says the glass skyscraper is a "shocking" contrast next to the white marble of the Ritz-Carlton Hotel. Saffron said she liked the blue glass and that the "angled aluminum cap over the first floor is an especially sleek finish, and ties nicely into the aluminum bands that organize the facade into horizontals and verticals." Her negative opinions of the building included the public space of Girard Park which she describe as a "barren, virtually unusable piece of concrete".

== See also ==
- List of tallest buildings in Philadelphia
