= Centre Square (building) =

Office complex in Center City, Philadelphia, Pennsylvania

Centre Square I & Centre Square II
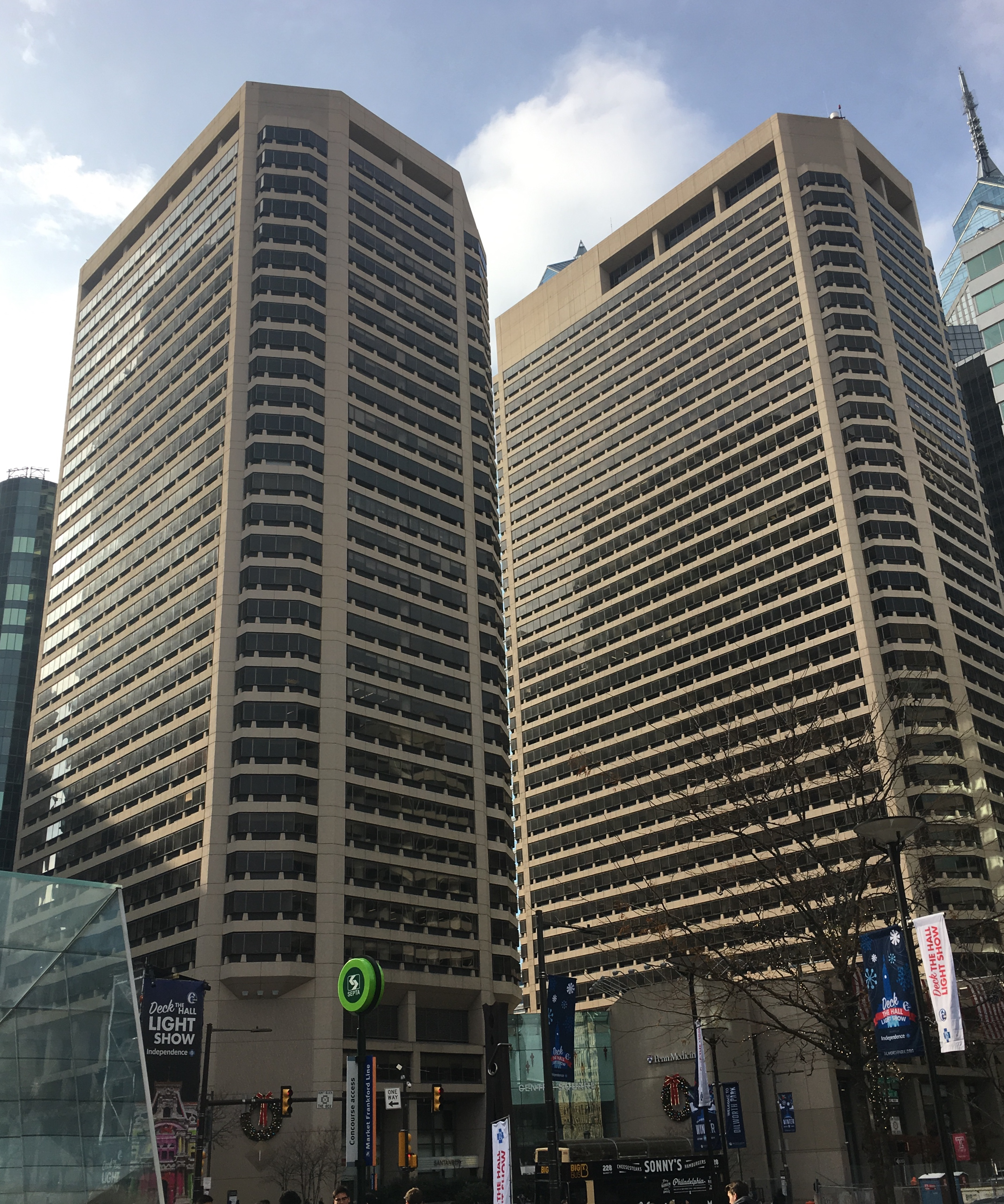
- Market and 15th Streets

- Location within Philadelphia Location within Pennsylvania Location within the United States

General information
- Status: Completed
- Type: Office
- Location: Philadelphia, Pennsylvania, U.S.
- Coordinates: 39°57′7″N 75°9′58″W
- Completed: 1973
- Cost: US$80 million
- Owner: CBRE Group

Height
- Roof: 417 feet (127 m) / 490 feet (150 m)

Technical details
- Floor count: 32 / 40
- Floor area: 1,800,000-square-foot (170,000 m^{2})

Design and construction
- Architect: Vincent Kling & Associates
- Developer: Andy Meiers

Centre Square is an office complex in Center City, Philadelphia, Pennsylvania. The complex consists of two concrete high-rise towers: the 417 feet (127 m) Centre Square I, also known as Centre Square East, and the 490 feet (150 m) Centre Square II (Centre Square West) represent the 24th and 15th-tallest buildings in Philadelphia, respectively. Designed by Vincent Kling & Associates in the 1960s, Centre Square opened in 1973. The complex is credited with shifting Philadelphia's downtown office district from South Broad Street to West Market Street. A tenant since 1975, management consulting firm Willis Towers Watson is Centre Square's largest tenant.

The complex is best known for Claes Oldenburg's sculpture, Clothespin, in the plaza in front of the building. A fan of contemporary art, developer Jack Wolgin commissioned three works under Philadelphia's percent for art program: Clothespin, Jean Dubuffet's Milord la Chamarre, and a series of banners by Alexander Calder. The works helped Philadelphia gain a reputation for promoting public art.

== History ==
In the 1960s, Wolgin began development of a two-tower high-rise complex in the West Market Street neighborhood of Philadelphia. Existing structures at the site were demolished in 1969 after the city condemned the structures using eminent domain. With the project over budget, Centre Square was redesigned just before construction was scheduled to begin. Originally intended to be two steel high rises, the redesign used concrete instead. Unlike similar projects in the city, the entire complex was constructed all at once. The US$80-million Centre Square opened in 1973 with First Pennsylvania Bank as the lead tenant. Centre Square is credited with shifting Philadelphia's downtown office district from South Broad Street to West Market Street.

The Metropolitan Life Insurance Company (MetLife) had an ownership stake in the complex ever since Centre Square was constructed and in 1992 became the sole owner. Wolgin sold his stake in the complex in the early 1980s, and a partnership led by Metropolitan Life of Virginia took control of the complex around 2000. In 2002 MetLife put the property up for sale, and in October of that year HRPT Properties Trust bought Centre Square for US$183.5 million plus closing costs. With the acquisition of Centre Square, HRPT Properties Trust (now called Equity Commonwealth) began an improvement and renovation plan for the complex. Improvements included modernization of its elevator, air conditioning, and safety systems. Architectural firm Daroff Design Inc.'s plans included cleaning the structures and a redesign of parts of the atrium and the plaza in front of the building.

In July 2017, Nightingale Properties, based in Manhattan, New York, purchased the buildings for $328 million, at the time the record for a multi-tenant property in Philadelphia. Centre Square went into receivership in mid-2023, and a court appointed CBRE as the owner. The buildings were nearly half vacant by then. By January 2025, the owners owed over $375 million on the mortgage, and the owners considered selling the buildings to pay off the debt. As the foreclosure proceedings continued, the buildings were placed for sale in August 2025, and CBRE considered selling the towers to a developer which would convert them to residential use.

== Architecture ==
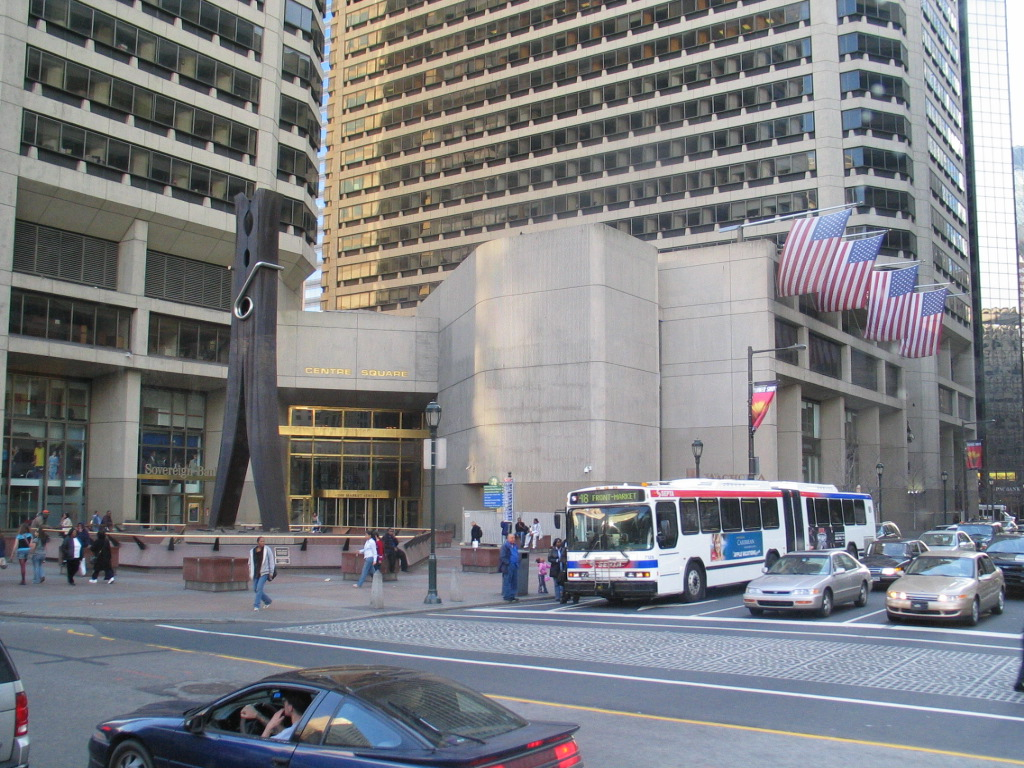
The plaza in front of Centre Square prior to redesign

Consisting of two concrete high-rise towers connected by an atrium, the 1,800,000-square-foot (170,000 m^{2}) Centre Square is located on Market Street between 15th and 16th Streets in Center City. Located just across 15th Street west of Philadelphia City Hall, Centre Square was designed by Vincent Kling & Associates. The complex was one of several buildings designed by Kling which surround City Hall. The buildings, including the Municipal Services Building and One Meridian Plaza, are collectively nicknamed "The Klingdom".

The smaller of the two towers, the 32-story east tower or Centre Square I is 417 feet (127 m) tall. The 40-story west tower, Centre Square II, located at the corner of Market and 16th Streets, stands 490 feet (150 m) tall. the two are the 24th- and 15th-tallest buildings in Philadelphia, respectively. The four-story atrium connecting the two high rises is topped by a domed skylight and the floors are connected by a triangular elevator. During renovations in 2008, a tower of changing light pipes replaced the elevator tower's marble encasement. The plaza in front of Centre Square at the corner of Market and 15th Streets has access to Southeastern Pennsylvania Transportation Authority's (SEPTA) 15th Street station.

=== Art ===
Centre Square has been the home to numerous works of contemporary art. Until the company left in the mid-1980s, Arco Chemical Co., whose headquarters was in Centre Square, had a large collection of contemporary art displayed throughout the complex. Philadelphia has a percent for art program, which requires that a percentage of construction costs be allocated for art. A fan and collector of contemporary art, developer Jack Wolgin had three pieces commissioned to fulfill the ordinance. The most famous piece is Claes Oldenburg's 45 feet (14 m) Cor-Ten and stainless steel sculpture, Clothespin. Located atop the subway entrance in the plaza in front of the building, Centre Square is best known because of Clothespin and is often called the Clothespin Building. Wolgin's lawyer said the lead tenant, the First Pennsylvania Bank, had requested a conventional statue of a general on a horse, but Wolgin said, "No. You're getting a clothespin." A second sculpture was also commissioned. The steel sculpture Milord la Chamarre by Jean Dubuffet was placed in the atrium. In the mid-1980s the interior was renovated and Milord la Chamarre was moved outside on Market Street. Also commissioned were eight banners by Alexander Calder. The banners, ranging from 18 feet (5.5 m) to 28 feet (8.5 m), were hung from the atrium ceiling and had colorful sun, flower, moon and night designs. The dyed cotton and silk banners, the only banners Calder ever designed, were removed during the renovations in the 1980s and were subsequently lost. After pressure from the Philadelphia Redevelopment Authority art program to search for the banners, they were discovered in a storeroom in the early 2000s. In 2009 some of the banners were put on temporary display at the Free Library of Philadelphia while the Redevelopment Authority works to find a place to have them displayed permanently.

Wolgin said his goal in commissioning the three pieces of art was "to provide art that would enhance Philadelphia by integrating into the daily life of those who live or work in the city the joy and inspiration derived from great art". Former head of the Redevelopment Authority art program Mary Kilroy said the art installed at Centre Square was the point when Philadelphia began to build its reputation as a great promoter of public art. In association with the Mural Arts Program, CommonWealth REIT is installing a glass mosaic mural below the Clothespin at the underground entrance to Centre Square. Made by Miriam Singer and Emilie Ledieu, the mural is intended to represent the geographies of the people who pass through the plaza and is expected to be completed in November 2011.

== Tenants ==
Saul Ewing leases 111,000 square feet (10,000 m^{2}) on the 36th, 37th, and 38th floors of Centre Square II. The law firm has made the building its headquarters since shortly after the building opened. Cable company Comcast made the Centre its headquarters from 1991 to 2007. Comcast moved into the complex after a fire seriously damaged its former headquarters at One Meridian Plaza across the street. It left Centre Square for its new headquarters in the Comcast Center despite attempts by HRPT Properties Trust to convince them to stay. In 1999, Lincoln National Corporation moved from Fort Wayne, Indiana to Centre Square. The company made 32,000-square-foot (3,000 m^{2}) in the west tower its headquarters despite moving 400 employees, including its top management, outside of Philadelphia and into Radnor Township, Pennsylvania in 2007. Law firm Conrad O'Brien leases space in the west tower. It leased 44,000-square-foot (4,100 m^{2}) on the 39th and 40th floors in 2011. A restaurant called Top of Centre Square was in Centre Square II. Located on the top floor, it was the highest restaurant in the city's history and closed in 1993.

For many years, one of the largest tenants was the management consulting firm Willis Towers Watson. Predecessor Towers Perrin had offices in Centre Square since 1975 and grew to 260,000 square feet (24,000 m^{2}) square feet in the east tower. In 2019, Willis Towers Watson vacated its space at the property in favor of 1735 Market.

== See also ==
- List of tallest buildings in Philadelphia
