= Annenberg Center for the Performing Arts =

Performing arts center in Philadelphia, United States

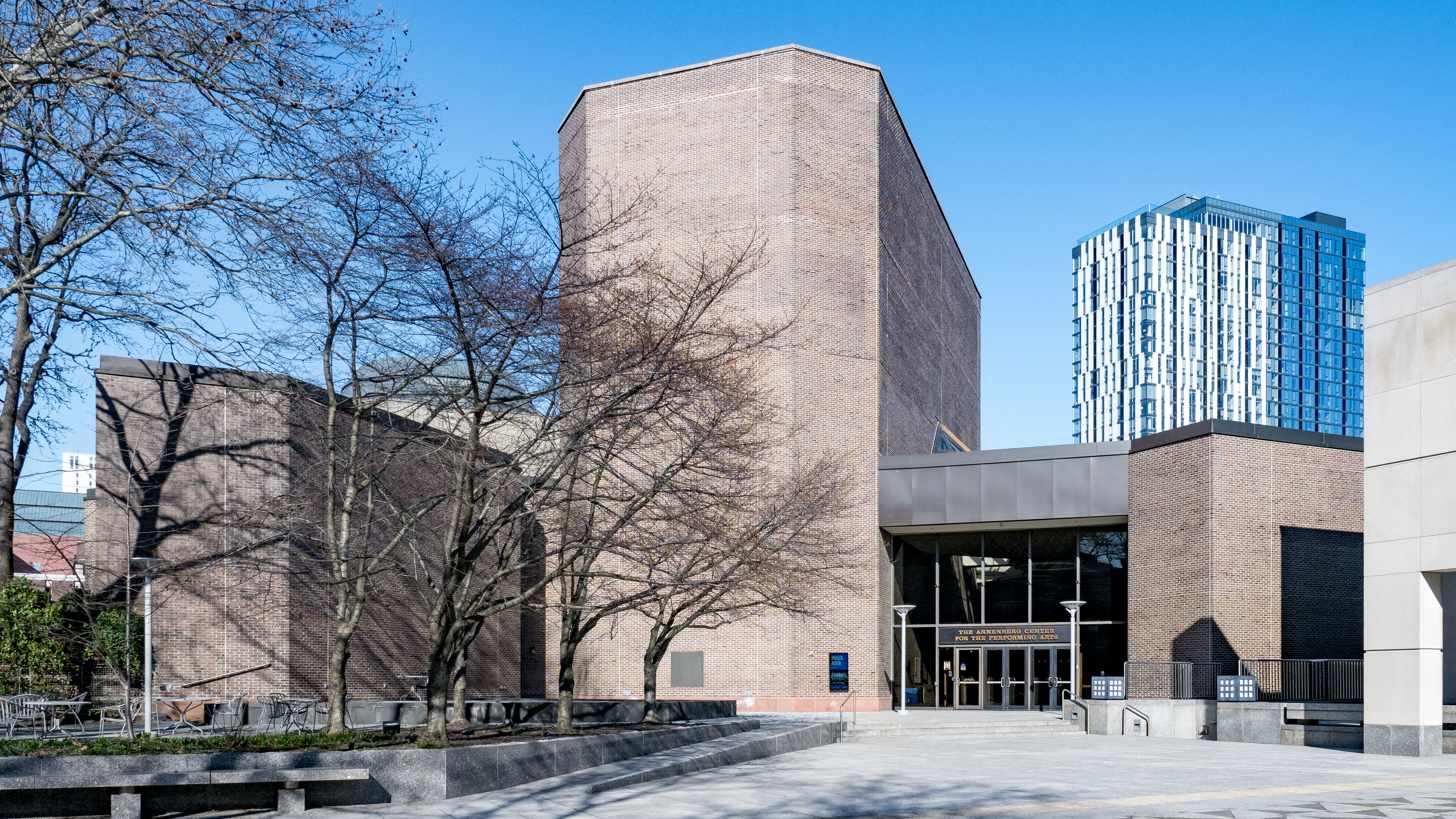
- The venue in 2024
- Interactive map of Annenberg Center for the Performing Arts
- Address: 3680 Walnut Street, Philadelphia, Pennsylvania, U.S.
- Location: Philadelphia, Pennsylvania, U.S.
- Coordinates: 39.9529°N 75.1965°W
- Owner: University of Pennsylvania
- Capacity: 960 (Zellerbach Theatre); 211 (Prince Theatre); 120 (Montgomery Theater)
- Type: Theatre
- Events: Jazz, dance, theatre, world music
- Public transit: 36th Street SEPTA

Construction
- Opened: 1971
- Architect: Vincent G. Kling

Website
- www.annenbergcenter.org

The Annenberg Center for the Performing Arts is a theatre, dance and world music venue in Philadelphia, Pennsylvania. It helped to popularize the works of composers like Steve Reich and Philip Glass; the Center has also hosted shows by performers ranging from the Jerusalem Symphony Orchestra to Ladysmith Black Mambazo.

The Annenberg facility was designed by Vincent G. Kling who also designed the Philadelphia Mint.

== History ==
The Annenberg Center, founded in 1971, is a major cultural destination and crossroads in the performing arts, connecting Philadelphia regional audiences and the University of Pennsylvania through exposure to innovative human expression in theatre, music, and dance.

The Annenberg Center highlights the value of the performing arts by presenting world-renowned and emerging artists and companies who express adventuresome perspectives on contemporary issues, timeless ideas, and diverse cultures. By offering contextualization programs, featuring Penn faculty as well as experts from the artistic and business communities, the Annenberg Center promotes critical thinking among its audiences, creating uniquely rewarding arts experiences.
