= Branch mint =

A branch mint is a satellite operation of (usually) a national mint. In many cases it will add a mint mark to coins that is different from that used at the main facility, although each country has different rules that may vary over time. Added letters are shown below for the United States, France and Switzerland. Because of this difference, coins produced at branch mints may be worth more or less to collectors than those from the main one, depending on their mintages.

== United States ==
The original and main mint of the United States Mint, has been located in Philadelphia (P or no letter), since 1793. Its current facility, Philadelphia's fourth, opened in 1969. U.S. branch mints have been located at:

- New Orleans (O), 1838-1909
- Dahlonega, Georgia (D), 1838-1861
- Charlotte, North Carolina (C), 1835-1861
- San Francisco (S), 1854-present
- Carson City, Nevada (CC), 1870-1893
- Denver (D), 1906-present
- Manila, Philippines (M), 1920-1922 and 1925-1941
- West Point, New York (W), 1984-present

An additional branch mint was planned at The Dalles, Oregon but it was abandoned during construction in 1869 and never operated.

== Great Britain ==
The Royal Mint of the United Kingdom is located at Llantrisant, Wales. It is currently the only facility of the Royal Mint, as the London Mint was closed in 1976, but has had branch mints in the past, located at:

- Ottawa, Ontario, Canada (now the main facility of the Royal Canadian Mint).
- The Perth Mint in Western Australia, a branch mint from 1899 to 1970 (even though Federation of Australia took place in 1901.
- The Sydney Mint, which closed in 1926.
- The Melbourne Mint.
- The Pretoria Mint, in Pretoria, South Africa.
- The Bombay Mint in India.

== France ==
The Monnaie de Paris—the French mint—is a state-owned industrial and commercial company (EPIC). The current French mint facility is in Paris. There have been numerous French mints since the French Revolution. These mints include cities outside of the traditional French borders as a result of the French Empire and other political events.

- Paris (A or no letter) 1795-present
- Metz (AA) 1797-1800
- Rouen (B) 1796-1846; 1853-1857
- Beaumont-le-Roger (B) 1941-1973
- Bruxelles/Brussels (B in a circle) - 1939
- Strasbourg (BB) 1797-1870
- Castelsarrasin (C) 1914; 1943-1946
- Genova (CL) 1813-1814 (First Empire)
- Lyon (D) 1796-1840; 1848-1858
- Genève/Geneva (G) (Switzerland) 1800-1805 (First Empire)
- La Rochelle (H) 1803-1835
- Limoges (I) 1797-1835
- Bordeaux (K) 1797-1803
- Bayonne (L) 1798-1835
- Toulouse (M) 1803-1836
- Marseille (M/A) 1801-1809
- Perpignan (Q) 1797-1835
- Orléans (R) 1797
- Nantes (T) 1797-1820; 1826-1835
- Lille (W) 1798 1846; 1853-1857
- Ütrecht (FISH) (Netherlands) 1812-1813 (First Empire)
- Turin/Torino (U) (Italy) 1803-1813 (First Empire)
- Rome (Crown/R) (Italy) 1812-1813 (First Empire)
- London (R) (England) 1815 (antecedent to the Restoration)
- Philadelphia (USA) 1944 (result of the German occupation of France)

== Canada ==
The Royal Canadian Mint, based in Ottawa, has one branch in Winnipeg, Manitoba. The Ottawa mint was itself a branch mint until the Royal Canadian Mint became independent of the British Royal Mint.

There was also a branch mint at Hull, Quebec, which was open for a few years.

== Switzerland ==
The current Swiss mint is located in Bern (B). In the past, Swiss coins were manufactured in Bruxelles/Brussels (B.), Strasbourg (BB and AB) and Paris (A). French coins of the First French Empire were made in Geneva. Most of the Swiss cantons were still producing their own coinage in 1848 when Switzerland re-constituted itself as a confederation and, in 1850, pegged the newly adopted Swiss franc to the French franc.
