= List of United States Mint medals =

== 1925 ==
Medal	Obverse design	Reverse design	Mintage	Available	Obverse	Reverse
Norse-American medal (gold)	Viking warrior	Viking longship	Proof: 100 (P)	1925		
Norse-American medal (silver)	Viking warrior	Viking longship	Uncirculated: 6,000 (P) (thin); 33,750 (P) (thick)	1925		
Norse-American medal (silver-plated bronze)	Viking warrior	Viking longship	Uncirculated: est. 60-75 (P)	1925		

== 1972 ==
Medal	Obverse design	Reverse design	Mintage	Available	Obverse	Reverse
"George Washington" Sons of Liberty bronze medal	George Washington	Liberty Tree, Join, or Die cartoon, and symbol of a two shilling six pence stamp	Proof: ---- P	1972		

== 1980 ==
Medal	Obverse design	Reverse design	Mintage	Available	Obverse	Reverse
Grant Wood American Arts medal	Grant Wood	American Gothic	Uncirculated: 500,000 (W)	1980		
Marian Anderson American Arts medal	Marian Anderson	Hands holding a globe	Uncirculated: 1,000,000 (W)	1980		

== 1981 ==
Medal	Obverse design	Reverse design	Mintage	Available	Obverse	Reverse
Mark Twain American Arts medal	Mark Twain	Steamboat on the Mississippi River	Uncirculated: 141,000 (W)	1981		
Willa Cather American Arts medal	Willa Cather	Woman plowing a field	Uncirculated: 200,000 (W)	1981		

== 1982 ==
Medal	Obverse design	Reverse design	Mintage	Available	Obverse	Reverse
Louis Armstrong American Arts medal	Louis Armstrong	Trumpet	Uncirculated: 420,000 (W)	1982		
Frank Lloyd Wright American Arts medal	Frank Lloyd Wright	Fallingwater	Uncirculated: 360,000 (W)	1982		

== 1983 ==
Medal	Obverse design	Reverse design	Mintage	Available	Obverse	Reverse
Robert Frost American Arts medal	Robert Frost	Three lines from Frost's poem, The Road Not Taken	Uncirculated: 500,000 (W)	1983		
Alexander Calder American Arts medal	Alexander Calder	Kinetic sculpture	Uncirculated: 410,000 (W)	1983		

== 1984 ==
Medal	Obverse design	Reverse design	Mintage	Available	Obverse	Reverse
Helen Hayes American Arts medal	Helen Hayes	Ribbon surrounding the words "First Lady of the Stage"	Uncirculated: 35,000 (W)	1984		
John Steinbeck American Arts medal	John Steinbeck	Farm scene	Uncirculated: 35,000 (W)	1984		

== 2007 ==
Medal	Obverse design	Reverse design	Mintage	Available	Obverse	Reverse
Martha Washington medal	Martha Washington	Mrs. Washington sewing, with slogan "First Lady of the Continental Army"	Uncirculated: ---- (P)	2007		
Abigail Adams medal	Abigail Adams	Mrs. Adams writing her famous "Remember the Ladies" letter	Uncirculated: ---- (P)	2007		
Thomas Jefferson's Liberty medal	Depiction of Liberty based on the Draped Bust coinage	Jefferson's grave at Monticello	Uncirculated: ---- (P)	2007		
Dolley Madison medal	Dolley Madison	Mrs. Madison posing before the Lansdowne Portrait of Washington, which she saved during the Burning of Washington	Uncirculated: ---- (P)	2007		

== 2008 ==
Medal	Obverse design	Reverse design	Mintage	Available	Obverse	Reverse
Elizabeth Monroe medal	Elizabeth Monroe	Mrs. Monroe at the reopening of the White House in 1818	Uncirculated: ---- (P)	2008		
Louisa Adams medal	Louisa Adams	Mrs. Adams and her son Charles making the dangerous journey from St Petersburg to Paris in 1812	Uncirculated: ---- (P)	2008		
Andrew Jackson's Liberty medal	Depiction of Liberty based on Capped Bust coinage	Jackson on horseback with his nickname "Old Hickory"	Uncirculated: ---- (P)	2008		
Martin Van Buren's Liberty medal	Depiction of Liberty based on Seated Liberty coinage	Van Buren reading in the grass in his home village of Kinderhook	Uncirculated: ---- (P)	2008		

== 2009 ==
Medal	Obverse design	Reverse design	Mintage	Available	Obverse	Reverse
Anna Harrison medal	Anna Harrison	Mrs. Harrison reading to her children	Uncirculated: ---- (P)	2009		
Letitia Tyler medal	Letitia Tyler	Mrs. Tyler with children on Cedar Grove Plantation	Uncirculated: ---- (P)	2009		
Julia Tyler medal	Julia Tyler	Mr. and Mrs. Tyler dancing	Uncirculated: ---- (P)	2009		
Sarah Polk medal	Sarah Polk	Mr. and Mrs. Polk working together at a desk in the White House	Uncirculated: ---- (P)	2009		
Margaret Taylor medal	Margaret Taylor	A young Mrs. Taylor tending to a wounded soldier during the First Seminole War	Uncirculated: ---- (P)	2009		

== 2010 ==
Medal	Obverse design	Reverse design	Mintage	Available	Obverse	Reverse
Abigail Fillmore medal	Abigail Fillmore	Mrs. Fillmore shelving books in the White House Library, which she established	Uncirculated ---- (P)	2010		
Jane Pierce medal	Jane Pierce	Mrs. Pierce in the visitors' gallery of the Old Senate Chamber, listening to a debate	Uncirculated ---- (P)	2010		
James Buchanan's Liberty medal	Depiction of Liberty based on Coronet (a.k.a. Liberty Head) coinage	Buchanan working as a bookkeeper in the family store	Uncirculated ---- (P)	2010		
Mary Todd Lincoln medal	Mary Todd Lincoln	Mrs. Lincoln giving flowers and a book to Union soldiers during the Civil War	Uncirculated ---- (P)	2010		

== 2011 ==
Medal	Obverse design	Reverse design	Mintage	Available	Obverse	Reverse
Eliza Johnson medal	Eliza Johnson	Three children dancing and a Marine Band violinist at the children's ball that was held for President Johnson's 60th birthday	Uncirculated ---- (P)	2011		
Julia Grant medal	Julia Grant	Grant and a young Julia Dent horse riding at White Haven, her family home	Uncirculated ---- (P)	2011		
Lucy Hayes medal	Lucy Hayes	Mrs. Hayes hosting the first Easter Egg Roll at the White House, 1877	Uncirculated ---- (P)	2011		
Lucretia Garfield medal	Lucretia Garfield	Mrs. Garfield painting on a canvas with brush and palette	Uncirculated ---- (P)	2011		

== 2012 ==
Medal	Obverse design	Reverse design	Mintage	Available	Obverse	Reverse
Alice Paul medal	Alice Paul	Alice Paul marching for women's suffrage	Uncirculated ---- (P)	2012		
Frances Cleveland (1st term) medal	Frances Cleveland	Mrs. Cleveland hosting a working women's reception	Uncirculated ---- (P)	2012		
Caroline Harrison medal	Caroline Harrison	Orchid and paint brushes	Uncirculated ---- (P)	2012		
Frances Cleveland (2nd term) medal	Frances Cleveland	Mrs. Cleveland delivering a speech	Uncirculated ---- (P)	2012		

== 2013 ==
Medal	Obverse design	Reverse design	Mintage	Available	Obverse	Reverse
Ida McKinley medal	Ida McKinley	Mrs. McKinley's hands crocheting slippers	Uncirculated ---- (P)	2013		
Edith Roosevelt medal	Edith Roosevelt	Image of the White House with compass and "The White House Restored 1902"	Uncirculated ---- (P)	2013		
Helen Taft medal	Helen Taft	Cherry blossom of Prunus serrulata, brought to Washington, DC by Mrs. Taft	Uncirculated ---- (P)	2013		
Ellen Wilson medal	Ellen Wilson	Commemoration of Mrs. Wilson's creation of the White House Rose Garden	Uncirculated ---- (P)	2013		
Edith Wilson medal	Edith Wilson	Image commemorating Mrs. Wilson's support for her husband after his stroke; the President holds onto a cane with Edith's hand resting warmly on top	Uncirculated ---- (P)	2013		

== 2014 ==
Medal	Obverse design	Reverse design	Mintage	Available	Obverse	Reverse
Florence Harding medal	Florence Harding	Items relating to Mrs. Harding's life: ballots and ballot box, camera, torch, and initials referencing World War I veterans	Uncirculated ---- (P)	2014		
Grace Coolidge medal	Grace Coolidge	U.S.A. spelled out in American Sign Language in front of the White House	Uncirculated ---- (P)	2014		
Lou Hoover medal	Lou Hoover	Radio commemorating Mrs. Hoover's radio address of 19 April 1929, the first by a First Lady	Uncirculated ---- (P)	2014		
Eleanor Roosevelt medal	Eleanor Roosevelt	A hand lighting a candle, symbolizing her life's work and the global impact of her humanitarian initiatives	Uncirculated ---- (P)	2014		

== 2015 ==
Medal	Obverse design	Reverse design	Mintage	Available	Obverse	Reverse
Bess Truman medal	Bess Truman	A wheel on railroad tracks, symbolizing Mrs. Truman's support for her husband on his 1948 whistle stop tour	Uncirculated ---- (P)	2015		
Mamie Eisenhower medal	Mamie Eisenhower	Hand holding an I Like Mamie badge	Uncirculated ---- (P)	2015		
Jacqueline Kennedy medal	Jacqueline Kennedy	Saucer magnolia flower (planted by Mrs. Kennedy beside the John F. Kennedy Eternal Flame) overlaid on an image of the world	Uncirculated ---- (P)	2015		
Lady Bird Johnson medal	Lady Bird Johnson	Jefferson Memorial, Washington Monument and flowers in reference to Mrs. Johnson's efforts in the beautification and conservation of America	Uncirculated ---- (P)	2015		

== 2016 ==
Medal	Obverse design	Reverse design	Mintage	Available	Obverse	Reverse
Pat Nixon medal	Pat Nixon	People standing hand-in-hand surrounding a globe, symbolizing Mrs. Nixon's commitment to volunteerism	Uncirculated ---- (P)	2016		
Elizabeth Ford medal	Elizabeth Ford	Young woman ascending a staircase, representing Mrs. Ford's openness and advocacy regarding addiction, breast cancer and women's rights	Uncirculated ---- (P)	2016		
Nancy Reagan medal	Nancy Reagan	Mrs. Reagan with two children wearing "Just Say No" T-shirts	Uncirculated ---- (P)	2016		

== 2017 ==
Medal	Obverse design	Reverse design	Mintage	Available	Obverse	Reverse
American Liberty 225th Anniversary medal	Lady Liberty	Soaring American Bald Eagle	Proof: ---- P	2017		

== 2018 ==
Medal	Obverse design	Reverse design	Mintage	Available	Obverse	Reverse
World War I Centennial Army silver medal	Soldier cutting a barbed wire, while another aims his rifle	Military service mark of the United States Army	Proof: ---- W	2018		
World War I Centennial Marine silver medal	Marine stands guard while another kneels	WWI-era version of the Emblem of the United States Marine Corps	Proof: ---- S	2018		
World War I Centennial Navy silver medal	Destroyer and two kite balloons	Officer's Cap Device	Proof: ---- P	2018		
World War I Centennial Air Service silver medal	Two views of the SPAD S.XIII	Military Aviator Insignia	Proof: ---- D	2018		
World War I Centennial Coast Guard silver medal	Lifeboat from the USCGC Seneca	WWI-era version of the Emblem of the United States Coast Guard	Proof: ---- P	2018		

== 2019 ==
Medal	Obverse design	Reverse design	Mintage	Available	Obverse	Reverse
American Legion 100th Anniversary silver medal	Eagle preparing for flight, five stars representing the five branches of the military	Field of stars with one star missing	Authorized: 10,000 (max) Proof: ---- (P)	May 20, 2019 – present		

== 2020 ==
Medal	Obverse design	Reverse design	Mintage	Available	Obverse	Reverse
Mayflower 400th Anniversary medal	TBA	TBA	----	TBA		

== 2022 ==
Medal	Obverse design	Reverse design	Mintage	Available	Obverse	Reverse
James K. Polk Presidential Silver Medal	TBA	TBA	TBA	February 14, 2022		
U.S. Navy Silver Medal	TBA	TBA	TBA	March 11, 2022		
Zachary Taylor Presidential Silver Medal	TBA	TBA	TBA	Spring 2022		
American Liberty Silver Medal	TBA	TBA	TBA	Summer 2022		
