= Julius Patton =

Superintendent of the Dahlonega Mint (1818–1887)

Julius Madeville Patton (February 8, 1818 – April 26, 1887) was an American official who was the fifth superintendent of the Dahlonega Mint. He became the superintendent of the Dahlonega Mint in 1853 and remained in the position until 1860.

== Biography ==
=== Career ===
In 1857, the Dahlonega Mint caught fire and Julius headed back to New York where he was from. The Dahlonega Mint was shut down for the remainder of the year and San Francisco Mint was charged to take on the remaining commission of Dahlonega, as they were the only Mint presently ahead of schedule at the time. The San Francisco Mint managed to finish the commission in time and loaded all the gold onto the S.S. Central America, nicknamed the Ship of Gold. The S.S. Central America was to head for New York.

While at San Francisco, Julius' private Iron Box of Gold was accidentally opened and restruck. There were approximately 20 coins in the box, including one Specimen Strike he personally hand struck at Dahlonega. Once it was realized that the coins belonged to Julius Patton, they were identified and collected and returned to his Iron Box where it was then relocked.

The S.S. Central America was said to be carrying over 4 tons of American Gold Coins and Bars. It fell upon a hurricane early in its voyage and was torn apart by winds exceeding 105 mph. The ship went down on 9/11/1857 but was declared lost on 9/12/1857.

== Legacy ==
In the late 1980s, when Treasure Hunter Tommy Thompson claimed to have found the ship, he is said to have hid the iron box of Julius during the first salvage. Returning to the shipwreck 19 years later and claiming it is partially linked to his ultimate downfall and capture.

Between October of 2016 and October of 2017 a representative of Tommy Thompson privately sold the coins in Elite Private Auctions around the world; including the legendary hand struck coin. A Canadian entrepreneur luckily secured three of the coins, including the hand struck coin by happenstance.

As of February 2018, the entrepreneur claims his son has sold the coins for what he originally purchased them for in order to buy into a friend's nightclub. He claims the coins are no longer in Vancouver but somewhere down in Texas.

A movie based around the treasure hunter turned fugitive Tommy Thompson, the iron box, the hand struck specimen strike, the remaining 19 coins of the box, the S.S. Central America and the 1857 Panic which it brought on after its sinking is slated to be released sometime in late 2019 or early 2020.

Preceded by Anderson Redding	Superintendent of the Dahlonega Mint; 1853–1860	Succeeded by George Kellogg
