= Dahlonega Mint =

Former branch of the United States Mint in Dahlonega, Georgia

Coordinates: 34.5299°N 83.9871°W

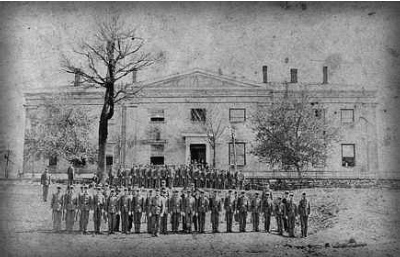
Students at North Georgia College practice military drill in front of the former Dahlonega Mint in 1877 or 1878. The college used the building from 1873 until it burned down in 1878.

The Dahlonega Mint was a former branch of the United States Mint built during the Georgia Gold Rush to help the miners get their gold assayed and minted, without having to travel to the Philadelphia Mint. It was located in Dahlonega, Georgia, on what is now the campus of the University of North Georgia. Coins produced at the Dahlonega Mint bear the "D" mint mark. That mint mark is used today by the Denver Mint, which opened in 1906, over four decades after the Dahlonega Mint closed. All coins from the Dahlonega Mint are gold, in the $1, $2.50, $3, and $5 denominations, and bear dates in the range 1838–1861.

== Creation ==
The Mint Act of 1835, enacted by the United States Congress on March 3, established "one branch at the city of New Orleans for the coinage of gold and silver; one branch at the town of Charlotte...for the coinage of gold only; and one branch at or near Dahlonega, in Lumpkin County, in the state of Georgia, also for the coinage of gold only."

Ignatius Alphonso Few, appointed commissioner, bought ten acres south of Dahlonega for $1,050 (Note: equivalent to $32,770 in 2025 adjusted for inflation) in August 1835, and hired the architect Benjamin Towns, the lowest bidder at $33,450, (Note: equivalent to $1,043,964 in 2025 adjusted for inflation) to construct the mint within eighteen months. Mint machinery was installed in 1837, which included "cutting presses, a fly wheel, a drawing frame, a crank shaft, a coining press, and eighteen annealing pans." The coining press could make "fifty to sixty gold coins per minute."

Superintendent Dr. Joseph Singleton opened the mint in February 1838. About a thousand ounces of gold were deposited in the first week, and the first coins consisting of eighty five-dollar gold pieces, were minted on April 17. (Note: Winter gives a date of April 21)

== Production ==
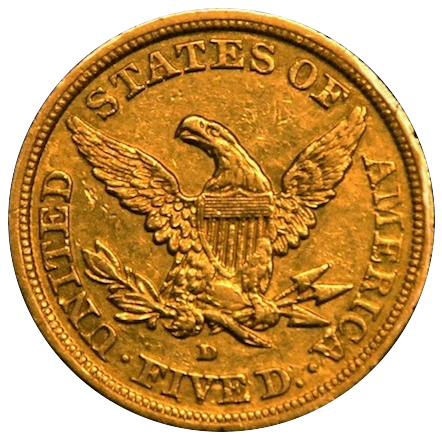
Reverse of an 1843 half eagle struck at the Dahlonega Mint

Within years of opening, the mint was not taking in the quantities of gold which had been anticipated. However, after local miners departed for the California gold rush in 1849, California gold was soon transported to Dahlonega for minting. The amount of California gold which was deposited at Dahlonega exceeded that from Georgia between about 1851 and 1854.

The mint produced coins every year from 1838 through 1861. Denominations produced included $1.00; $2.50 (quarter eagles); $3.00 (1854 only); and $5.00 (half eagles). The use of a small coin press limited the size of the coins which could be produced. In 1840, the mint was authorized to produce silver coinage, though this never occurred due to insufficient equipment. Coins minted in later years are noted for their poorer quality, possibly due to worn out presses or the use of second-quality dies.

Because of their relatively low mintage, all Dahlonega-minted gold coins are rare. It is generally accepted that gold coins estimated to exceed $6 million were minted here.

== The Civil War ==
After the American Civil War broke out in 1861, the Dahlonega Mint was seized by the Confederates. The facility, at the time of the seizure, contained an estimated $13,345 in gold, some of which may have been used to mint gold dollars and half eagles under the authority of the Confederate States Government. The exact number of 1861-D gold dollars produced is unknown (estimated between 1,000 and 1,500), while approximately one to two thousand 1861-D half eagles were struck. The building served as a repository of the Confederate Treasury during the war.

== Post Civil War ==
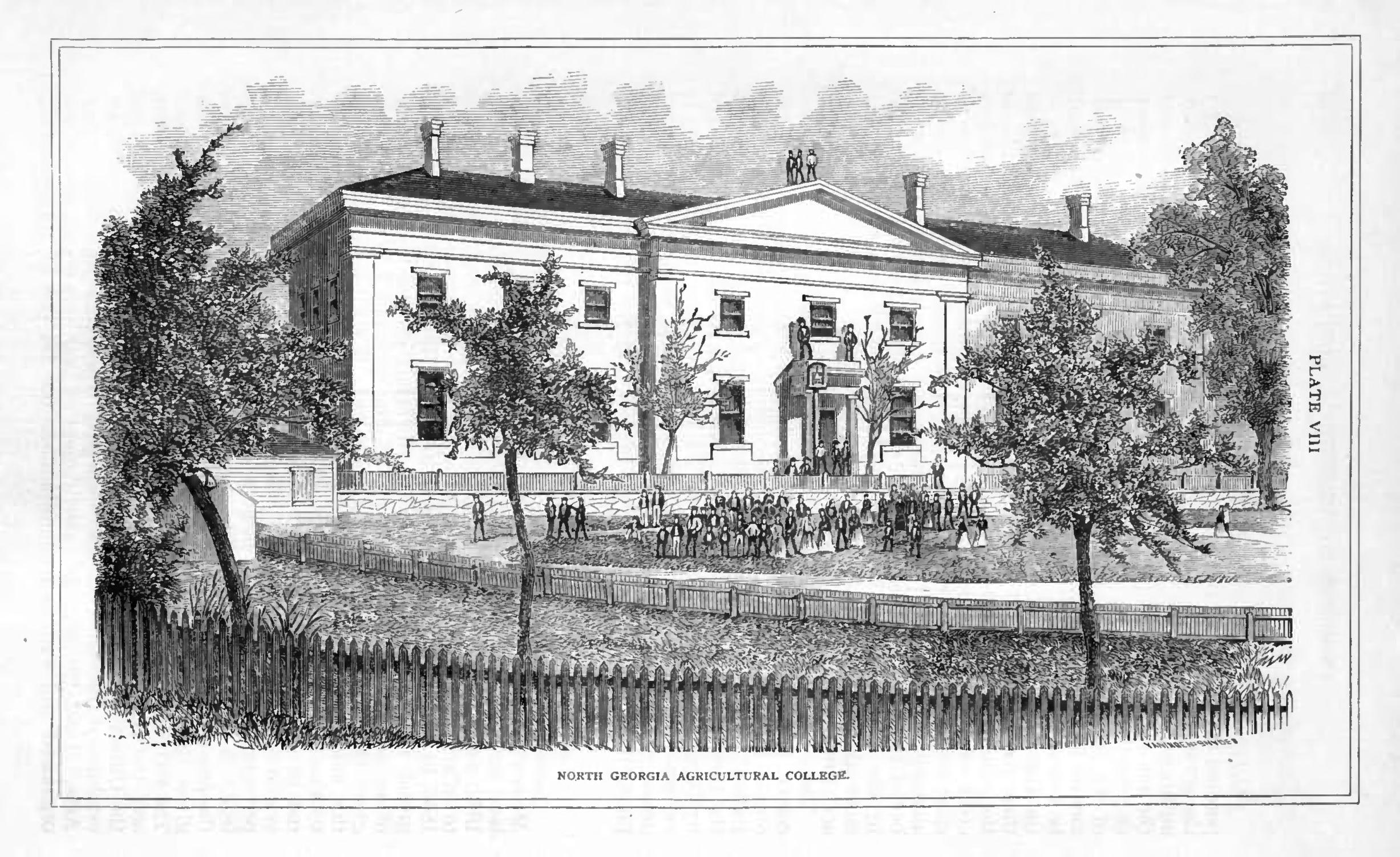
The North Georgia Agricultural College, previously the Dahlonega Mint, drawing from 1872

After the end of the Civil War, The United States Government decided against reopening the mint. The building was unused until the founding of the University of North Georgia (or North Georgia College, as it was initially known) in 1873. The mint building was used as the main academic and administrative building for the college until a fire destroyed the original building in December 1878. A new building for the college was erected on the foundations of the old mint building. This building is now named Price Memorial Hall after William P. Price, the founder of the college, and is still used by the college today.

Gold leaf from this area also covers the exterior of the domed roof over the rotunda of the Georgia State Capitol in Atlanta. Local media often refer to the state legislature's activities as what's going on "under the gold dome". After the capitol building was gold leafed, citizens of Dahlonega began a campaign to gold leaf Price Memorial Hall after the same fashion as the capitol.

== Denominations minted ==
Coin type	Series	Years minted	Image	Notes
Gold dollar	Liberty Head	1849–1854		
Gold dollar	Indian Head	1855–1861		Around 1,000–1,500 1861-D gold dollars were struck under the authority of the Confederate States of America.
Quarter eagle	Classic Head	1839	Upload image	
Quarter eagle	Liberty Head	1840–1857; 1859	Upload image	
Three-dollar piece	Indian Head	1854	Upload image	
Half eagle	Classic Head	1838	Upload image	
Half eagle	Liberty Head	1839–1861	Upload image	Around 1,000–2,000 1861-D half eagles were struck under the authority of the Confederate States of America.

== Superintendents ==
Six men acted as Superintendent of the Dahlonega Mint.

- Joseph Singleton, 1838–1841. President Andrew Jackson nominated him for the position on December 19, 1836, which was approved by the United States Senate Committee on Finance.
- Paul Rossignol, 1841–1843
- James Fairlie Cooper, 1843–1849
- Anderson Redding, 1849–1853
- Julius Patton, 1853–1860
- George Kellogg, 1860–1861

== See also ==
- List of Mints
- Historical United States mints
- Carson City Mint
- Charlotte Mint
- Denver Mint
- New Orleans Mint
- Philadelphia Mint
- San Francisco Mint
