= James Fairlie Cooper =

Superintendent of the Dahlonega Mint

- Born: September 2, 1814; New York City, US
- Died: October 14, 1869 (aged 55); Atlanta, Georgia, US
- Burial place: Oakland Cemetery in Atlanta, Georgia
- Military career
- Allegiance: United States; Confederate States of America
- Branch: US Army; Confederate States Army
- Service years: 1834–1837 (USA); 1861 (CSA)
- Rank: Second Lieutenant (USA); Lieutenant Colonel (CSA)
- Unit: 3rd U.S. Infantry
- Commands: 7th Georgia Infantry Regiment (CSA)
- Conflicts: American Civil War
- Other work: Minter, engineer, surveyor

James Fairlie Cooper (September 2, 1814 – October 14, 1869) was an American minter and soldier.

== Biography ==
Cooper was born in New York City on October 2, 1814. He was an alumnus of the United States Military Academy at West Point; graduating in 1834 as 17th out of 36. Commissioned into the United States Army he served in the 3rd U.S. Infantry as a second lieutenant; doing topographical surveys and being stationed in Louisiana. Cooper resigned his commission in 1837.

By 1843, he had become the (third) superintendent of the Dahlonega Mint in Georgia and remained in the position until 1849. Forty-four percent of the mint's coinage was struck during his tenure.

When the American Civil War started in 1861, he briefly served in the Confederate States Army from May to December as lieutenant colonel of the 7th Georgia Infantry Regiment.

Afterwards, he became a civil engineer and surveyor. He died in Atlanta, Georgia, on October 14, 1869, and was buried there on Oakland Cemetery.

Preceded by Paul Rossignol	Superintendent of the Dahlonega Mint; 1843–1849	Succeeded by Anderson Redding
