= West Point Mint =

Branch of the United States Mint

- West Point Mint; Formerly: West Point Bullion Depository
- U.S. National Register of Historic Places
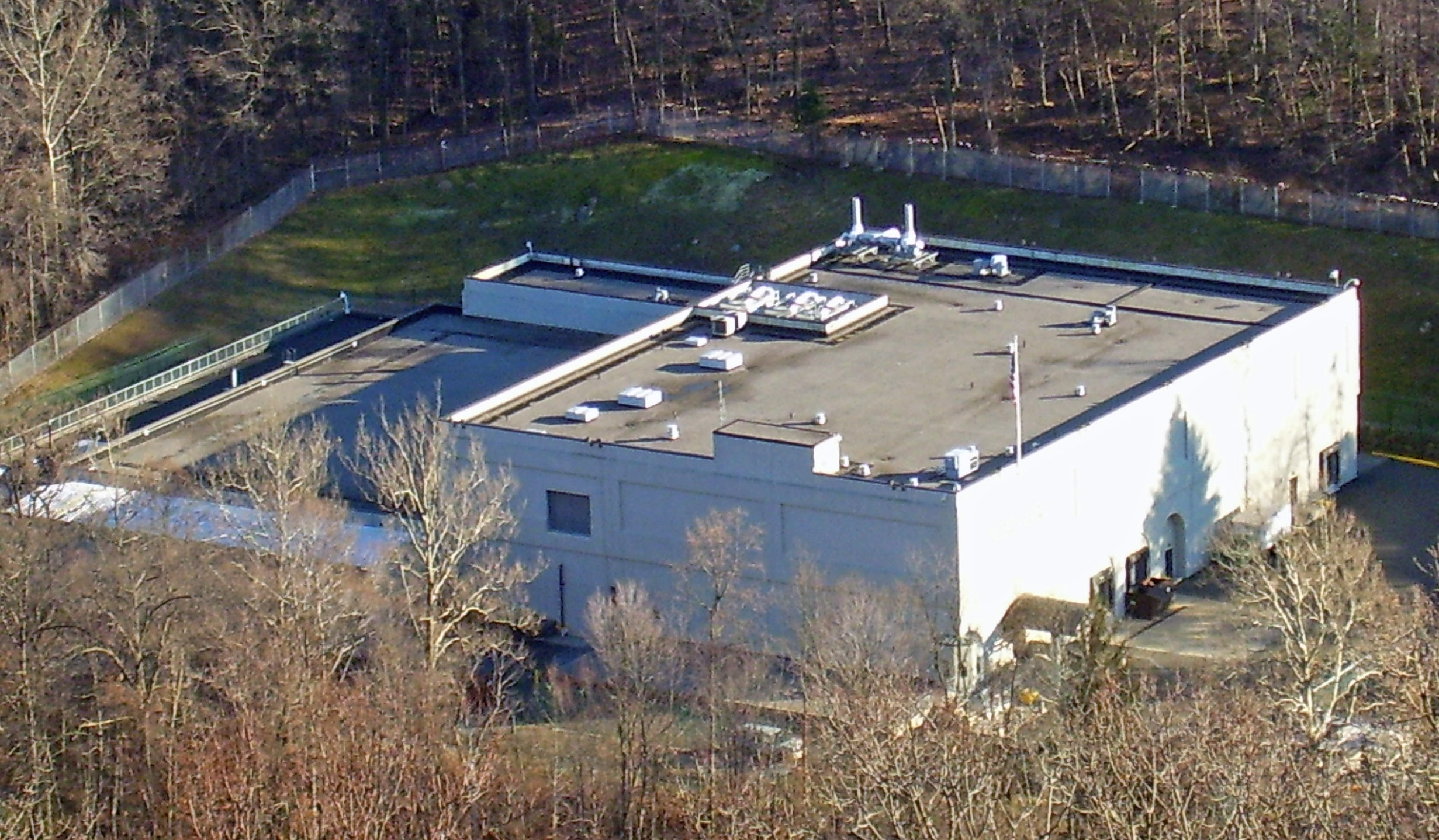
- The mint building seen from U.S. 9W, 2008
- Location: West Point, NY
- Nearest city: Peekskill
- Coordinates: 41°23′47″N 73°58′56″W
- Area: 4 acres (1.6 ha)
- Built: 1937
- Architect: Louis A. Simon
- NRHP reference No.: 88000027
- Added to NRHP: 1988

The West Point Mint is a U.S. Mint production and depository facility erected in 1937 near the U.S. Military Academy in West Point, New York. As of July 2025, the facility held 54,067,331 troy ounces (1,681,682.0 kg) fine gold (over $183 billion USD as of August, 2025). As of 2019, 54 million troy ounces represented 22% of the United States' gold reserves.

The mint at West Point is second only to the gold reserves held in secure storage at Fort Knox. Originally, the West Point Mint was called the West Point Bullion Depository. At one point it had the highest concentration of silver of any U.S. mint facility, and for 12 years produced circulating Lincoln cents. It has since minted mostly commemorative coins and stored gold.

It gained official status as a branch of the United States Mint in March 1988. Later that year it was listed on the National Register of Historic Places.

== Building ==
Prior to its 2005 remodel that added a second story, the mint was a 170-by-256-foot (52 by 78 m) one-story reinforced concrete structure with a flat roof. The walls are mostly featureless, with some recessed arches at the entryways. It is on a 4-acre (1.6 ha) parcel of land near the northern facilities of the United States Military Academy, with parking lots on either side. The interior contains minting presses and bullion compartments.

== History ==
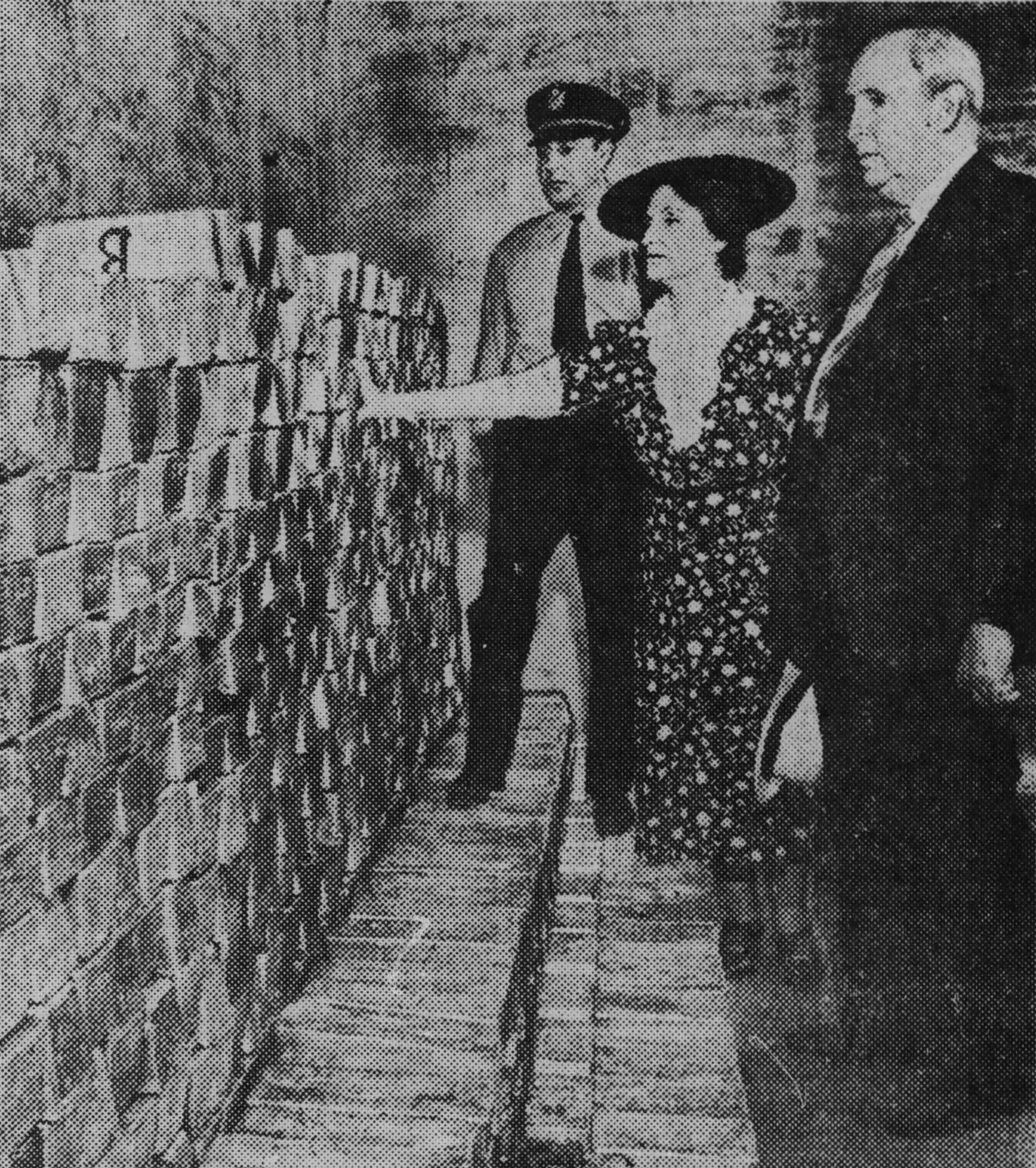
Nellie Tayloe Ross inspects silver arriving at West Point in 1938

In 1937, it served as a storage facility for silver bullion and was nicknamed "The Fort Knox of Silver." Even without United States Mint status, it produced U.S. coinage. From 1974 to 1986, the West Point Mint produced Lincoln cents bearing no mint mark, making them indistinguishable from those produced at the Philadelphia Mint. Between 1977 and 1979, Washington quarters were produced as well. Approximately 20 billion dollars' worth of gold was stored in its vaults in the early 1980s, although this was still significantly less than at Fort Knox.

September 1983 saw the first appearance of the "W" mint mark, from this still unofficial U.S. Mint, on a $10 gold coin commemorating the 1984 Los Angeles Olympic Games. It was the first legal tender U.S. gold coin minted since 1933. In 1986, American Gold Eagle bullion coins were solely produced at this facility, again, with no mint mark. The West Point Bullion Depository was granted mint status on March 31, 1988 (Pub. L. 100–274). Starting in 1999 American Silver Eagle bullion coins were also produced at the mint.

In 2002, the U.S. Military Academy at West Point was honored for its 200th anniversary. A bicentennial commemorative silver dollar was issued and unveiled on March 16 of that year, featuring a cadet color guard on the obverse and the helmet of Pallas Athena on the reverse. The coin was produced only at the West Point Mint.

== Special West Point coinage ==
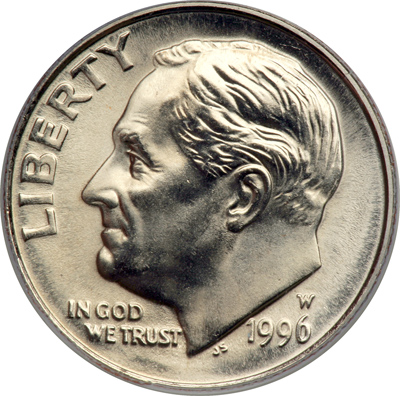
An unusual "W"-mint-marked dime from West Point Mint

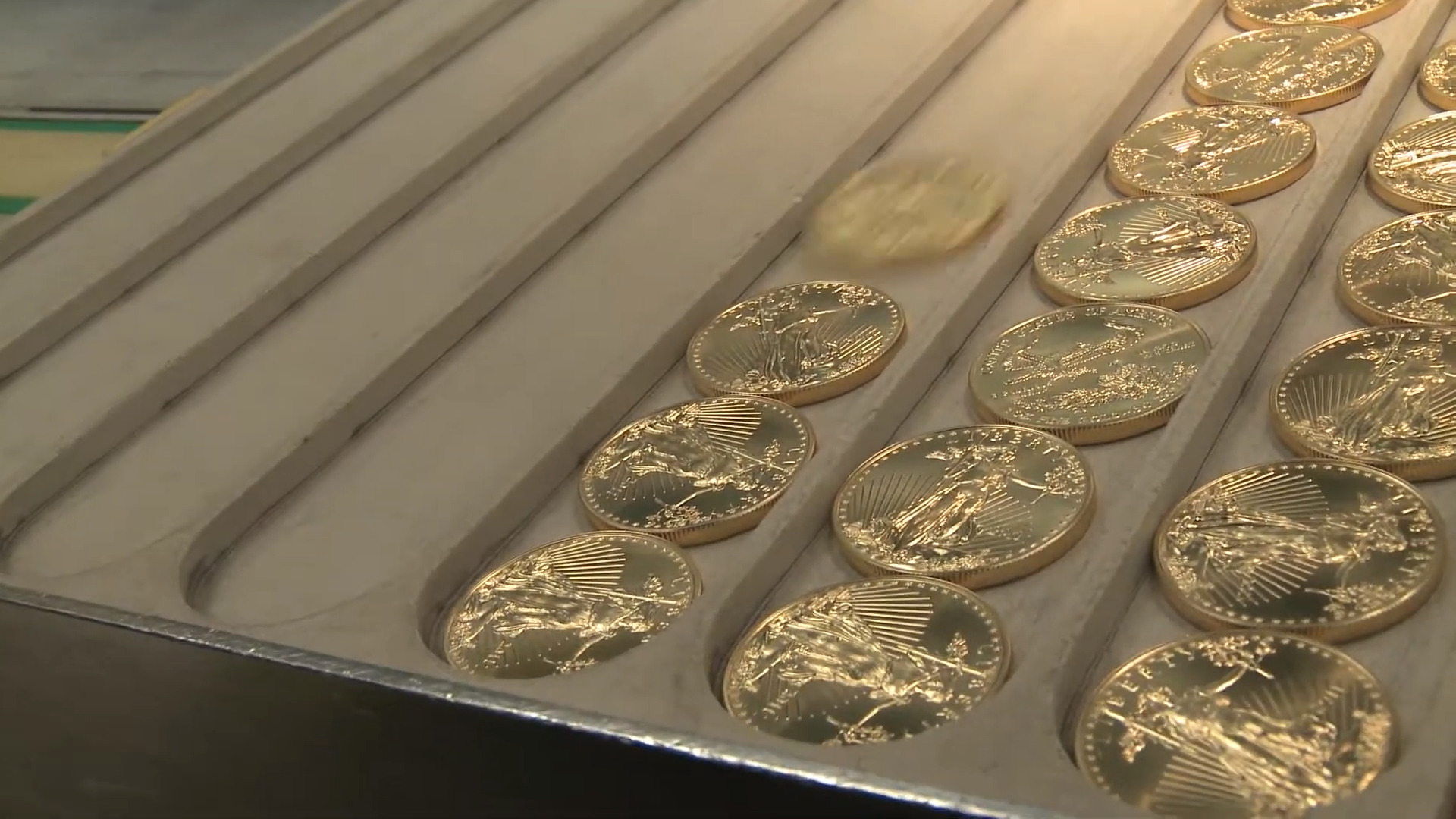
Newly-struck American Gold Eagle coins sliding into a tray at the West Point Mint

In 1996, an unusual coinage from West Point occurred, when a commemorative Roosevelt dime was produced for the 50th anniversary of the design. Given as an insert with the standard mint sets sold that year, over 1.457 million were produced. Thus, although this "W"-mint-marked dime is not particularly scarce, it was made only for collectors.

In 2014, a reverse-proof silver Kennedy Half Dollar which was part of a commemorative set, along with the 24K gold proof Kennedy Half Dollar were produced there to commemorate the 50th anniversary of the Kennedy Half Dollar design, again with the "W" mint mark.

In 2015 another "W"-mint-marked dime was issued along with a 2015-W dollar, these as part of a three-coin set to commemorate the March of Dimes. Only 75,000 sets were produced.

In 2015, the West Point Mint struck Sacagawea Dollars for the first time. Released as part of a special “Native American Coin and Currency Set”, only 90,000 were produced.

In 2019, the first cents to display the "W" mint mark were produced for collectors. These West Point Lincoln cents were added to traditional mint and proof sets and were minted in three different finishes. An uncirculated 2019-W cent was included with the uncirculated set. A proof 2019-W cent was included with the proof set. A reverse-proof 2019-W cent was included with the silver proof set. There are no mintage limits for these sets, and individual buyers are not limited in the quantities they are allowed to order.

In April 2019, the United States Mint announced that 10 million quarters would be placed into circulation containing the "W" mint mark, in an effort to promote the hobby of coin collecting. Although quarters had been produced at the West Point Mint before, none of them included the "W" mint mark. These quarters are a part of the "America the Beautiful" quarters program. 2 million of each of the five national park quarters released in 2019 were scheduled to contain the "W" mint mark. This was continued in 2020, with the 2020 coins including a special "V 75" privy mark, commemorating the 75th anniversary of the end of World War II.

In January 2020, the United States Mint announced that each of the three annual sets released in 2020 would include a "W"-mint-marked Jefferson nickel, just as was done with the Lincoln Cents the previous year. A proof nickel was included with the clad proof set and a reverse-proof nickel with the silver proof set. Originally the uncirculated coin set was to contain a 2020-W uncirculated nickel. This plan was scrapped due to the coin shortage caused by the coronavirus pandemic.

The commemorative uncirculated 1776~2026 Peace dollar and Morgan dollar were produced at West Point, though both lack a mint mark.

== Present ==
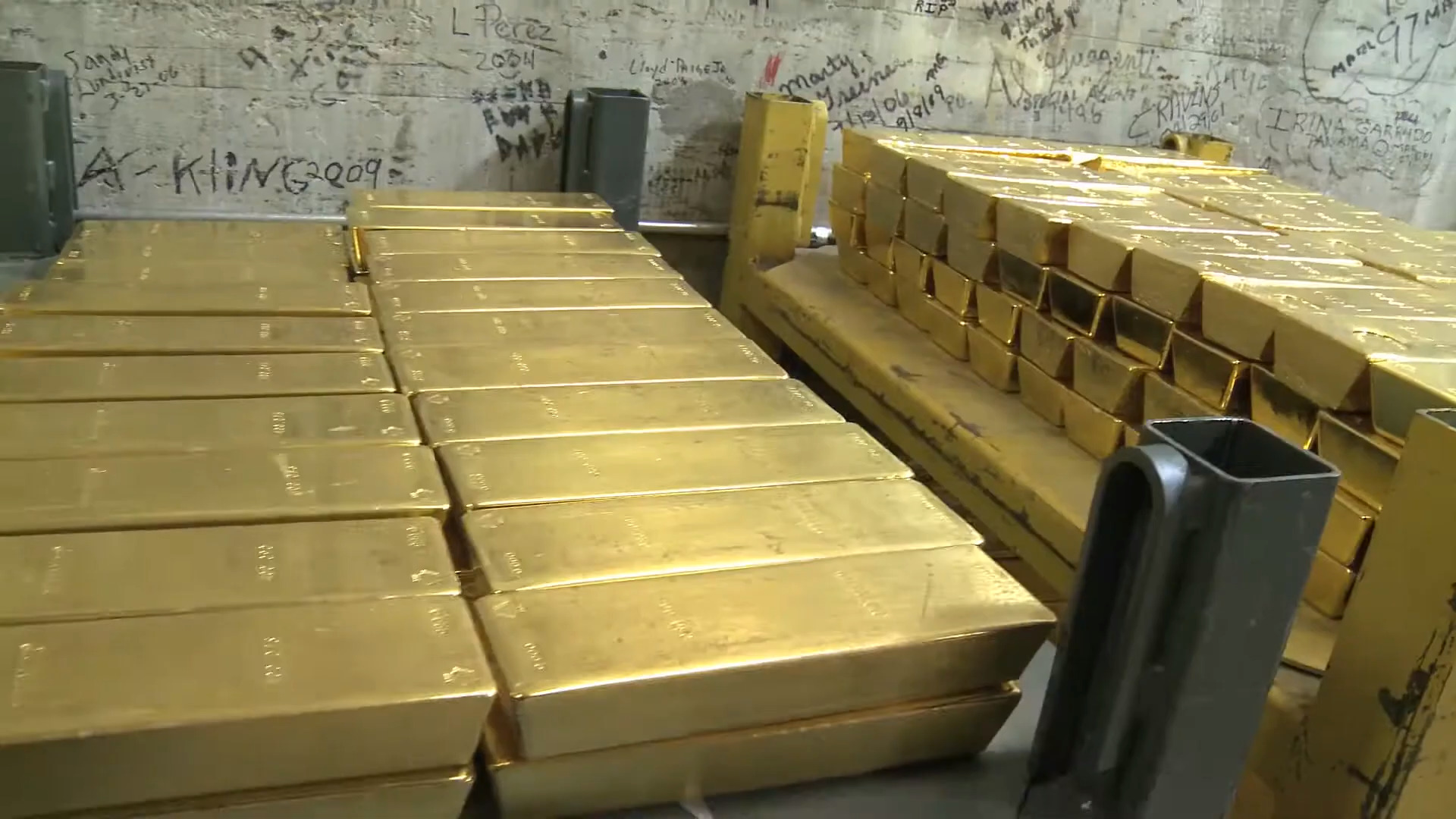
Gold bars held at West Point Mint in 2011

Currently all American Eagle series proof and uncirculated bullion coins in gold, silver, platinum, and palladium are produced at West Point, along with all gold commemorative and a few silver commemorative coins. Bullion and proof gold Eagles and some uncirculated and all proof silver Eagles, and all commemoratives from West Point are struck with the "W" mint mark. Since 2006, the West Point Mint has made all American Buffalo gold bullion coins.

The West Point Mint is a gold bullion depository, and silver is kept on site only in quantities to meet minting demands. Due to the presence of such large quantities of gold bullion on site, security is high. For this reason, it is closed to the public, and its address is withheld by the National Park Service in its National Register listings, though Google Maps gives the site as 1063 NY-218, West Point, NY 10996.

== See also ==
- List of Mints
- Historical United States mints
- American Arts Commemorative Series medallions
- National Register of Historic Places listings in Orange County, New York
