= Manila Mint =

Former coinage mint in Manila, Philippines

- Coordinates: 14.5877°N 120.9777°E

The Manila Mint (Spanish: Casa de la Moneda y Timbre de Manila) was a coinage mint that briefly served as a branch of the United States Mint, located in Manila, now the capital city of the Philippines.

== History ==
=== Spanish facility ===
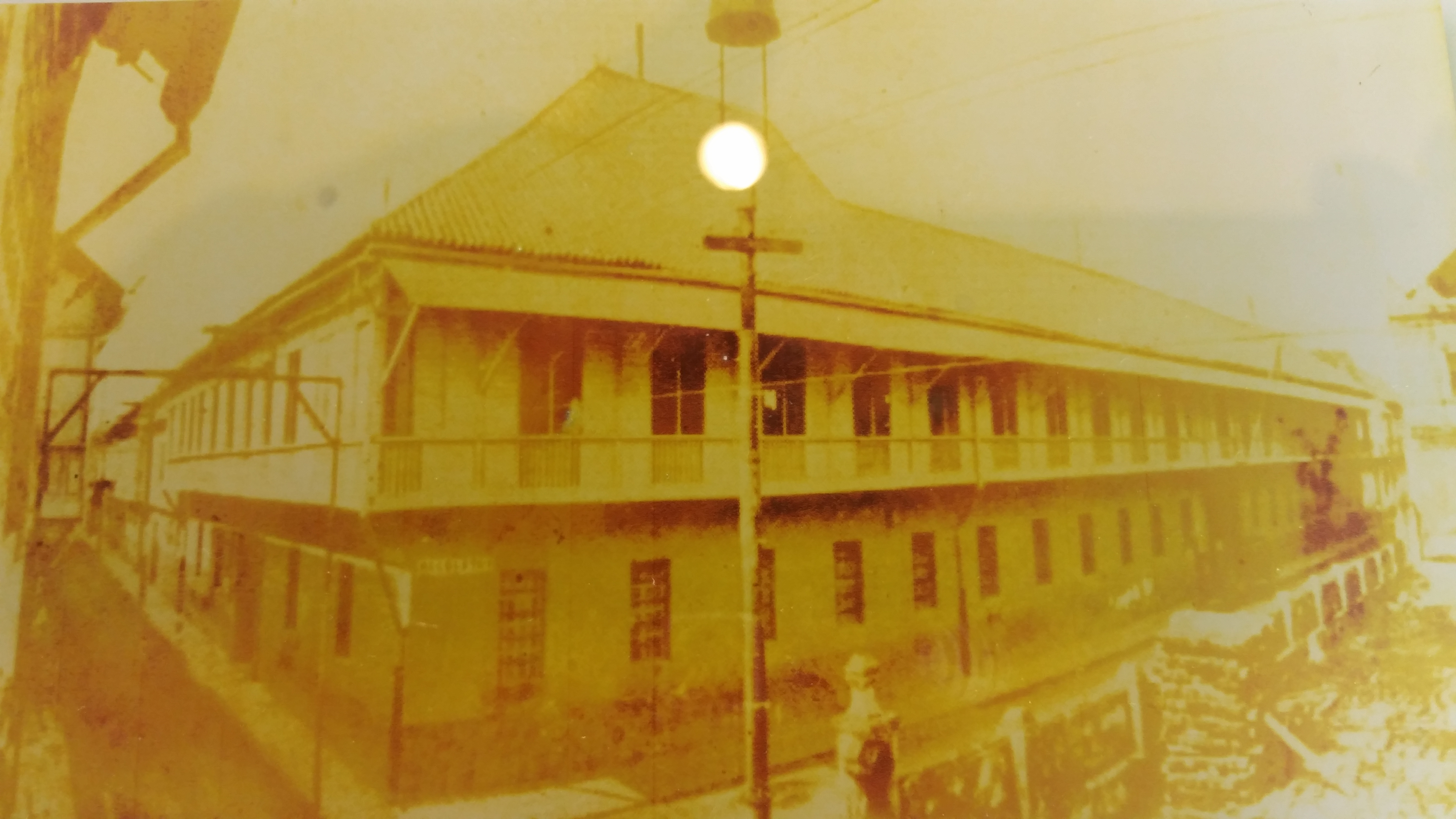
Casa De Moneda De Manila located at the corner of Cabilda and Recoletos, Intramuros

Originally constructed from 1857 through 1861 under the auspices of the Spanish government, the "Casa de Moneda" (as it was called then) began issuing gold coinage in the denominations of one, two, and four pesos in 1861. On March 5, 1862, permission was also granted to coin silver coinage, which began in 1864 for the ten- and twenty-centavo denominations, and 1865 for fifty centavos. The coins all bore the image of the then-reigning Spanish monarch, Queen Isabel II. In 1868, Isabel was deposed, but the mint continued to issue coinage in all six denominations until 1873, all dated 1868 and indistinguishable from those minted in 1868. In 1880 under the auspices of then-current Spanish king Alfonso XII, coinage production resumed, this time with the king's image, and a slightly lower silver content for the ten, twenty, and fifty centavo denominations. Only a very small number of gold coins were issued, all being of the four-peso denomination. In 1885 Alfonso XII died, with control of Spain to go to his (as yet unborn) son, Alfonso XIII. Once again, the Casa de Moneda continued to issue coins until 1898, all dated 1885 and indistinguishable from those minted in 1885.

=== United States possession ===
Shortly after the Spanish–American War and a brief insurgency by the Filipinos, the country became a United States possession. Unlike all other territories taken by the United States, the United States soon began to produce a special coinage for the Philippines. To encourage circulation, the denominations were modeled on those produced by the Spanish, namely a silver peso similar to that minted in Madrid in 1897, denominations of fifty, twenty (instead of twenty-five), and ten centavos, and a one-centavo coin similar in size to some pattern cents minted by the Spanish. The noted Philippine sculptor Melecio Figueroa was enlisted to provide the designs for the coinage, creating a seated man design for the base-metal denominations and a standing woman design for the silver denominations, the latter of which is thought to have been modeled on his daughter Bianca. In 1903 the San Francisco Mint began producing silver coins for the Philippines, and the Philadelphia Mint producing proofs and base-metal coins, along with providing some additional silver issues for circulation. Coins minted in San Francisco had a small "S" mintmark placed to the left of the date; Philadelphia coins were without a mintmark. In 1904 all Spanish and other foreign coinage was demonetized.

The territorial coinage minted for the Philippines was locked in an exchange rate of two pesos to one dollar and issued in denominations of half, one, five, ten, twenty, and fifty centavos and one peso. The half centavo proved useless in commerce and was withdrawn from circulation in 1904, and owing to a rise in silver prices, the silver denominations (ten centavos on up) were all reduced in size and alloy in 1907. In 1908, the San Francisco mint was finally authorized to coin base-metal coins and was thus positioned to take over all coinage production for the Philippines after that. After 1912 the peso ceased to be minted. Such was the state of the coinage for the Philippines when the United States decided to establish a branch mint in the Philippines to take over the role then occupied by the San Francisco mint.

=== Official United States Mint branch ===
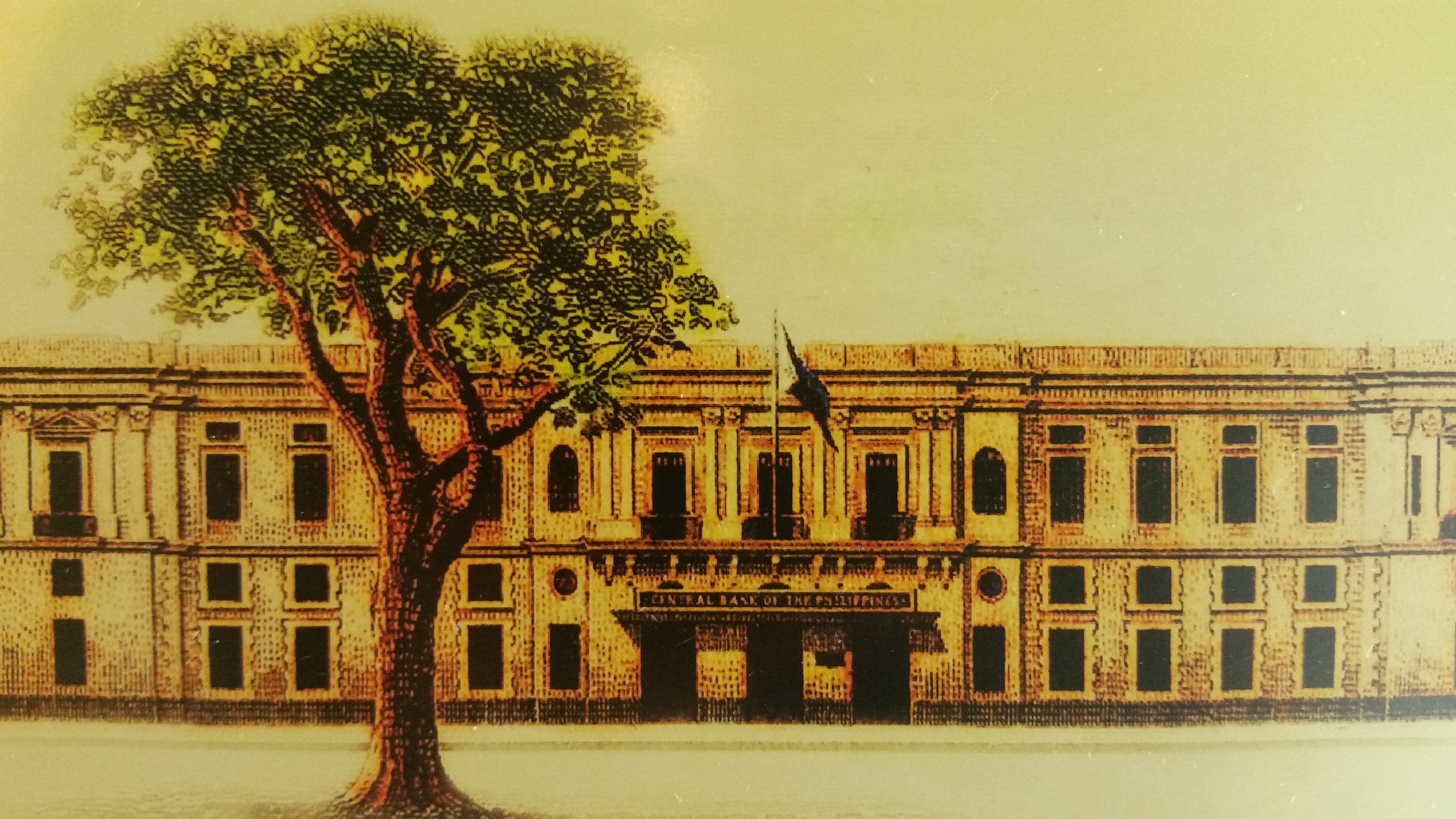
Manila Mint (Old La Intendencia Building)

In 1920, the Manila Mint was reopened under United States auspices and was the first (and to date only) U.S. branch mint located outside the Continental United States. It produced coins until 1922 and then again from 1925 to 1941, when the Japanese Empire invaded the Philippines during World War II. The mint was operated under Japanese auspices during the occupation. No U.S. coins were produced at Manila after 1941 due to the occupation and to Philippine independence in 1946, although Philippine coinage did take place at the other U.S. mints in 1944 through 1946 (all dated 1944 and 1945 only). The mint also produced a special coinage for the inmates at the Culion Leper Colony. The building housing the mint was destroyed during the retaking of the city in 1945.

== Coinage and mintmarks ==
=== Mintmarks ===
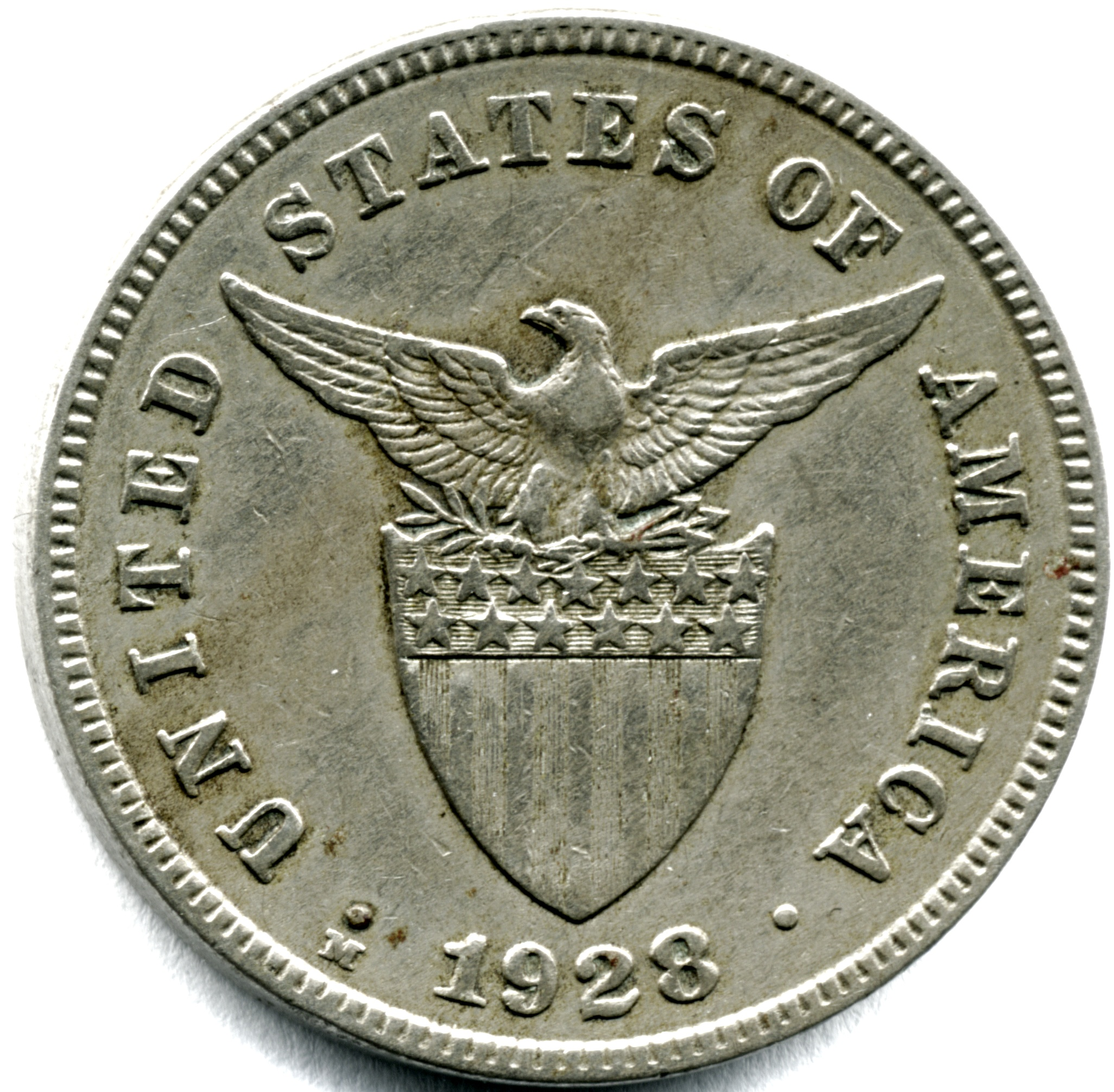
The mintmark "M" is at the left side of the date

In the beginning, the Manila mint produced its coins without a mintmark, but in 1925 it began using the "M" mintmark on all of its coins until its closure at the end of 1941 with the Japanese invasion. In 1936, to commemorate the Philippines' becoming a commonwealth and no longer a mere territory, Ambrosio Morales was commissioned to generate new designs for commemorative fifty-centavo and one-peso coins. The coins he designed featured Manuel L. Quezon as the Philippines' first commonwealth president, General Murphy, and U.S. President Franklin D. Roosevelt. A new design for the reverse, based on the seal of the commonwealth that Morales designed, was also introduced on those commemoratives and featured on all Philippine coins minted from 1937 until 1946. When Philippine coinage production resumed in 1944, the one-, five-, and fifty-centavo pieces were again struck in San Francisco (complete with "S" mintmark), five-centavo pieces were also struck in Philadelphia (no mintmark), and the ten- and twenty-centavo pieces were struck in Denver, introducing the "D" mintmark to Philippine coinage. All of these coins featured the new commonwealth reverse design. On July 4, 1946, the era of the commonwealth ended as independence was granted to the Philippines as a sovereign nation.

=== Produced denominations ===
The Manila Mint struck coins in the following denominations:

Base-metal denominations (identical to alloys used for United States one cent and five cents)

One centavo (1920–1922, 1925–1934, and 1936–1941)
Five centavos (1920–1921, 1925–1928, 1930–1932, 1934–1935, 1937–1938, and 1941)

Silver denominations (75% silver for ten through fifty centavos and 80% for the peso)

Ten centavos (1920–1921, 1929, 1935, 1937–1938, and 1941)
Twenty centavos (1920–1921, 1928–1929, 1937–1938, and 1941)
Fifty centavos (1920–1921 and 1936 commemorative)
One peso (1936 commemorative only, with two varieties)

Leper colony coinage (struck in aluminum in 1920 and in brass all later years)

One centavo (1927 and 1930)
Five centavos (1927)
Ten centavos (1920 and 1930)
Twenty centavos (1920 and 1922)
One peso (1920, 1922, and 1925)

In addition, a medal (commonly called the "Wilson Dollar", owing to having a design featuring then-current U.S. president Woodrow Wilson and being similar in size to a silver dollar) was issued in gold, silver, and copper in 1920 to commemorate the opening of the Manila Mint.
