= Mint mark =

Coin inscription

A mint mark is a letter, symbol or an inscription on a coin indicating the mint where the coin was produced. It is distinct from a mintmaster mark, the mark of the mintmaster.

== History ==
Mint marks were first developed to locate a problem. If a coin was underweight, or overweight, the mint mark would immediately tell where the coin was minted, and the problem could be located and fixed. Another problem which could occur would be a dishonest mint official debasing the coin, or putting less precious metal in the coin than specified. The first mint marks, called "Magistrate Marks" were developed by the Greeks, and named the Magistrate in charge of producing that coin. Debasing a coin, or otherwise tampering with it, was a very serious crime, often punishable by death in many civilizations. For example, in 1649, the directors of the Spanish colonial American Mint at Potosí, in what is today Bolivia, were condemned to death for seriously debasing the coinage. The initials of the assayer as well as the mint mark were immediate identifiers when the coins were inspected.

In some cases the symbols found in the field of ancient Greek coins indicated mints, not magistrates. Mints in territories conquered by Alexander the Great struck coins with the types he used in Macedon but marked with a local symbol. For example, Rhodes struck coins with Alexander's types marked with a rose, a local symbol previously used on its own coins.

A reform of Diocletian made mint marks a regular feature of ancient Roman coinage. These mint marks were placed at the bottom of the reverse of the coin and contained three parts. The first part indicates that this was a coin with either SM for Sacra Moneta, M for Moneta, or P for Pecunia. The second part was an abbreviation of the name of the mint such as ROM for Rome or LON for London. The final part indicated the workshop within the mint. The reform of Anastasius, which is the traditional dividing point between the coinage of the Roman and the Later Roman (a.k.a. Byzantine) empires, replaced the mint marks on gold coins by the inscription CONOB, meaning the pure standard of Constantinople, which was used by a variety of mints. Mint marks continued on copper coinage until the second half of the seventh century, however.

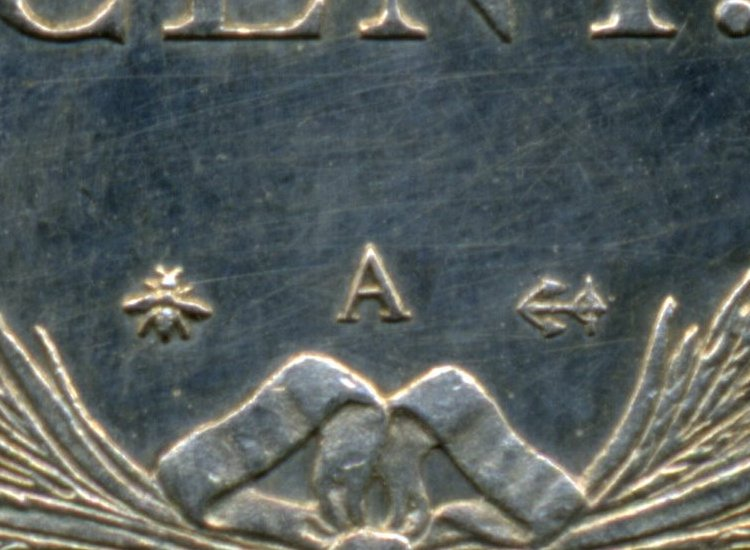
Mint mark and privy marks on French Cochinchina 20 Cents 1879, Paris Mint

Mint names began to appear on French coins under Pepin and became mandatory under Charlemagne. In 1389, Charles IV adopted a system called Secret Points. This scheme placed a dot under the first letter of the legend on coins of Crémieu, under the second letter for Romans, up to the twenty-second letter for Bourges. In the fifteenth century letters or symbols placed at the end of the legend indicating the mint were used in addition to Secret Points. In 1540, Francis I discontinued Secret Points in favor of a system of letters; A for Paris, B for Rouen, …, Z for Lyon; in the field. He also made it the rule for mint-masters to place their personal marks on coins, as they had done with increasing frequency since the coinage of Louis XI. This was one of the few royal practices continued by the Republic of France. The mint letters continued until 1898 (briefly revived in 1914 and from 1942 to 1958) and the mint-masters marks, supplemented by the mark of the Chief Engraver, are still used.

Some Medieval English coins used mint names . When William III retired hammered coinage, branch mints which helped strike machine made coins to replace it put their initials below his bust. The Royal Mint established branches to coin sovereigns near the sources of gold. These issues show the initials of Sydney, Melbourne, Victoria, and Perth Australia as well as Canada, South Africa, and India. The privately owned Soho Mint obtained a contract to strike royal copper coins with steam presses and put its name on these coins and on coins it minted for other countries. When it closed, Ralph Heaton acquired its equipment, founded the Birmingham Mint, and put his H mint mark on coins of Canada, among others.

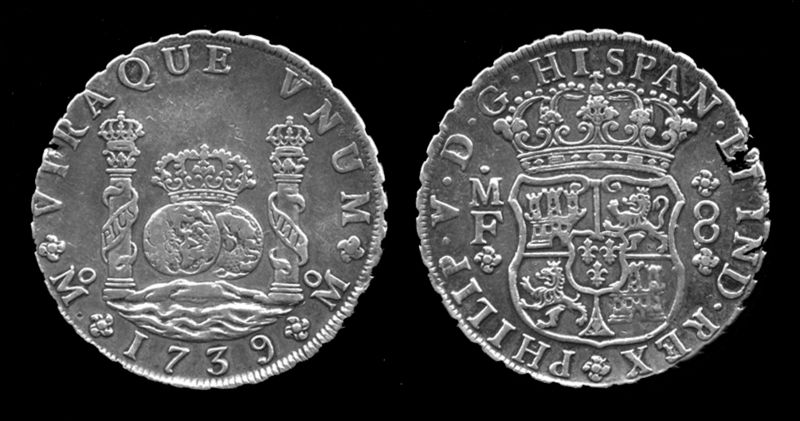
Spanish Milled Dollar with Mexico City Mint Mark.

The Spanish Empire introduced mint marks to the New World when they authorized Mexico City to open a mint on 11 May 1535. The Spanish Empire established mints throughout its American territories, each with their own mint mark. After its revolution, Mexico continued to use its colonial Mo monogram mint mark shown on either side of the date in the Spanish Milled Dollar. The United States of America established mints in Charlotte, North Carolina and Dahlonega, Georgia in 1838 after the Georgia Gold Rush and put its first mint marks on the gold coins struck there. Like other countries, the United States has since placed mint marks not only on its own coins but also those of its territories, such as the Philippines, and other countries for which it has contracts to strike coins, such as Fiji.

== Mint marks in numismatics ==
In the 19th century, numismatists (coin collectors) did not generally collect coins according to mint mark; rather, they attempted to obtain date sets of coins. A turnaround began after 1893, when A. G. Heaton's "A Treatise on Coinage of the United States Branch Mints" was published. Heaton cited example after example of mint-marked coins that were much scarcer than Philadelphia products and that should bring high premiums. When the United States abandoned silver coinage in 1964, mint marks were removed from the new copper-nickel coins in the belief that it would reduce the removal of coins from circulation by collectors. The silver coins quickly disappeared from circulation, and it was feared that if collectors saved too many of the new coins, there would be a serious shortage of coinage. Mint marks were returned to United States coins in 1968.

== United States Mint Marks ==
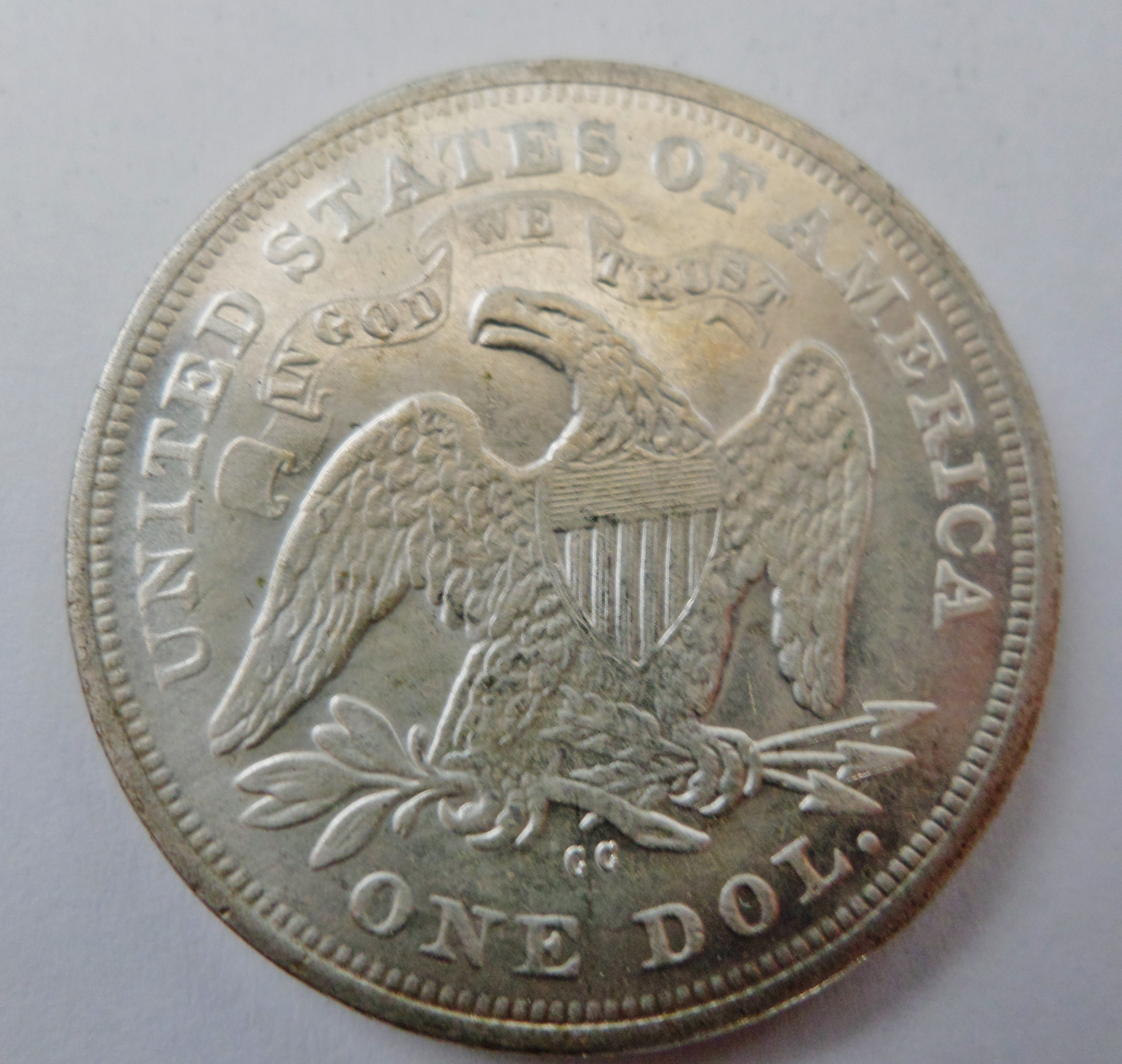
Carson City Mint 1872 "Liberty Seated" silver dollar reverse, bearing the mint's CC mint mark just beneath the eagle.

The current mint marks on United States coinage are P, D, S, and W for the four currently operating U.S. Mints. The letter P is used for the Philadelphia Mint, D for the Denver Mint, S for the San Francisco Mint, and W for the West Point Mint.

There have been nine official United States Mints. The first U.S. Mint was in Philadelphia, which began coin production with large cents and the half cents of pure copper in early 1793. Other U.S. Mints, prior to the twentieth century, were considered "branch mints."

United States mint marks were originally used to distinguish coins not made in Philadelphia. The eight mint marks used to distinguish coins not minted in Philadelphia are as follows, listed chronologically with date of first coinage production:

- D for Dahlonega Mint February 12, 1838;
- C for Charlotte Mint March 27, 1838;
- O for New Orleans Mint May 8, 1838;
- S for San Francisco Mint April 3, 1854;
- CC for Carson City Mint February 11, 1870;
- D for Denver Mint March 12, 1906 (no overlap with previous "D" mint at Dahlonega, which permanently closed in 1861);
- M for Manila Mint July 15, 1920 ( an official U.S. Mint overseas for the coinage of a one centavo); and
- W for West Point Mint July 29, 1974.

The West Point Mint began coin production to ease the shortage of quarters and other minor coinage; this facility bore no mint mark. Thus, West Point coins could not be distinguished from those made at the Philadelphia Mint. The West Point "W" mint mark was first used on the $10 gold coins commemorating the 1984 Olympic games in Los Angeles.

Most Philadelphia Mint coins from earlier than 1980 were unmarked with the notable exceptions being wartime nickels (1942–1945) and Susan B. Anthony dollars (1979–1999). The "P" mint mark was first used on the Susan B. Anthony Dollars starting 1979.

From 1980 until 2017, the Lincoln cent was the only coin that did not always have a mint mark, using a "D" when struck in Denver but lacking a "P" when ostensibly struck at the Philadelphia mint. This practice allowed the additional minting of coins at the San Francisco mint ("S") and West Point mint ("W") without the use of their respective mint marks to address circulating coinage needs without the concern of creating scarce varieties that would be plucked from circulation by collectors. In the single year of 2017 the Philadelphia "P" was added to the Lincoln cent to celebrate 225 years of Philadelphia Mint service.

Generally 21st century coins with an "S" or "W" do not circulate, being mostly produced as bullion, commemorative, proof coinage or other "collector coinage" sold by the U.S. Mint to either authorized bullion wholesalers or directly to collectors. There was also an exception, the 2019-W quarter made for circulation. Only 2 million were made for each design. The West Point Mint continues to make "W" quarters intended for circulation. This is called "The Great American Coin Hunt." The "S" mint mark were also used for circulated coins until 1980.

== Other countries ==
Although the US and several other countries use the initial letter of the city for its mint marks, this practice is not universal. For instance, Germany used A for Berlin, D for Munich, E for Muldenhutten, F for Stuttgart, G for Karlsruhe and J for Hamburg. When Spain adopted decimal coinage in 1848, it used stars with different numbers of points as mint marks. Madrid used six pointed stars, Barcelona used eight pointed stars, and so on. After the revolution of 1868, small dates were placed in these stars. The small dates indicated the year the coin was struck, as opposed to the large date on the coin which was the year it was authorized.

Many mints of the world commonly use a Privy mark, which is a symbol unique to each mint. The Royal Canadian Mint commonly uses a maple leaf privy mark. Segovia, Spain used an aqueduct, a local landmark, before it switched over to the star system in 1868. The private mint of the French Coinage Society Poissy Branch used a thunderbolt mint mark on coins of France, its colonies, Romania and other countries.

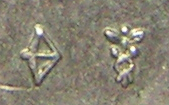
Privy mark (left) and mint mark on a Dutch coin. The mint mark is that of the mint of Utrecht. Since 1830 (with an interruption in 1941–1945) this mark is pressed on all Dutch coins.

Many Islamic coins bear an inscription telling which mint produced the coin. This inscription is often the name of the city where the coin was minted spelled out in Arabic script.

Several euro coins have mint marks of their respective Mint. See Identifying marks on euro coins for more information.

== See also ==
- Hallmark
- Privy mark
