= American Arts Commemorative Series medallions =

Gold bullion medallions minted 1980–1984

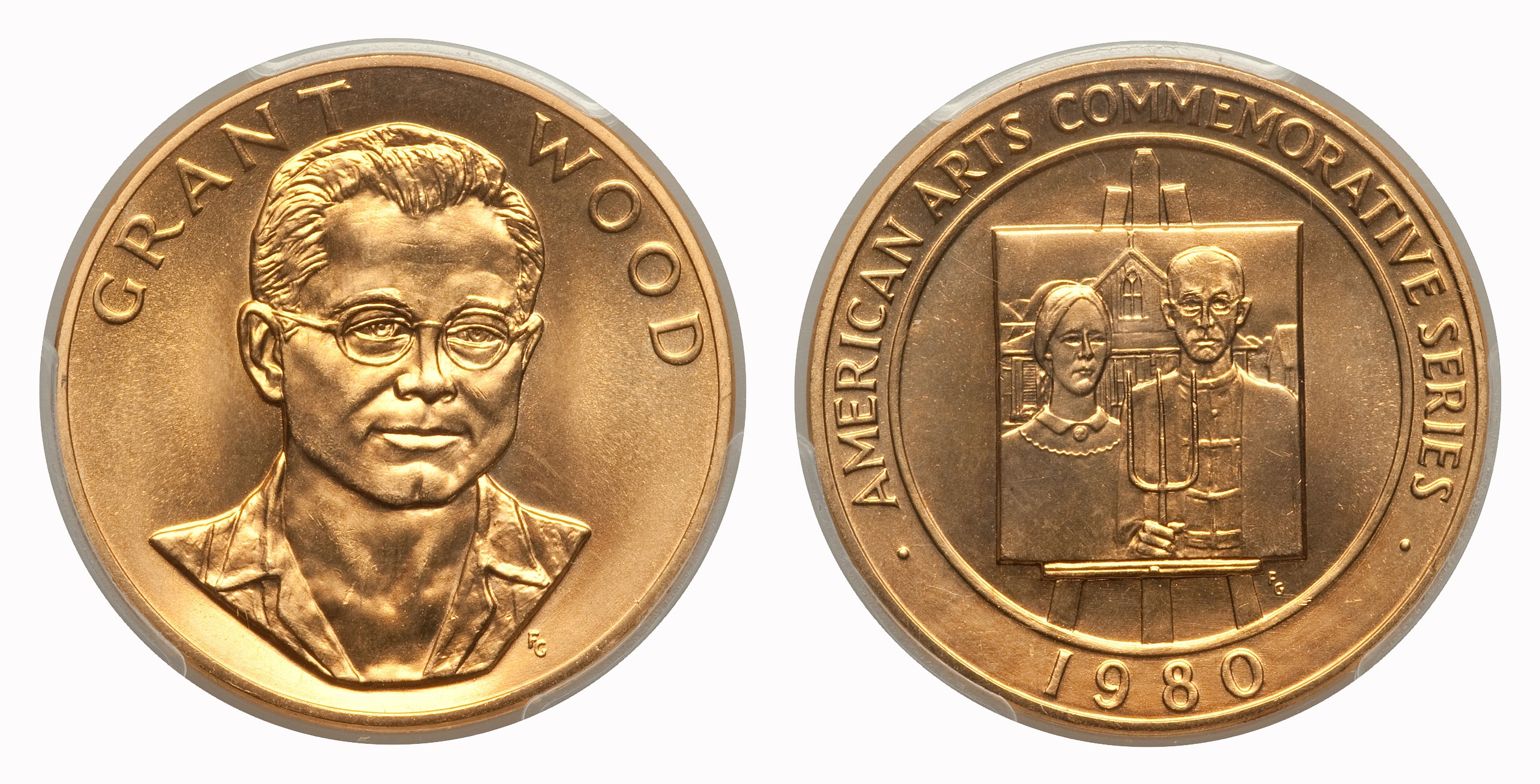
A 1980 Grant Wood one ounce gold medallion

American Arts Commemorative Series Medallions are a series of ten gold bullion medallions that were produced by the United States Mint from 1980 to 1984. They were sold to compete with the South African Krugerrand and other bullion coins.

The series was proposed by North Carolina Senator Jesse Helms after the United States Department of the Treasury began selling portions of the national stockpile of gold. Iowa Representative Jim Leach suggested that the medallions depict notable American artists. President Jimmy Carter signed the bill containing the authorizing legislation into law on November 10, 1978, despite objections from Treasury officials.

The medallions were initially sold through mail order; purchasers were required to obtain the day's price by telephone before ordering. Later, the Mint sold them through telemarketing. Mintage ceased after the ten different medallions approved by Congress were produced. All were struck at the West Point Bullion Depository. The series sold poorly, prompting critics to blame the involved process by which they were first marketed, and the fact that they were medallions rather than coins.

== Background ==
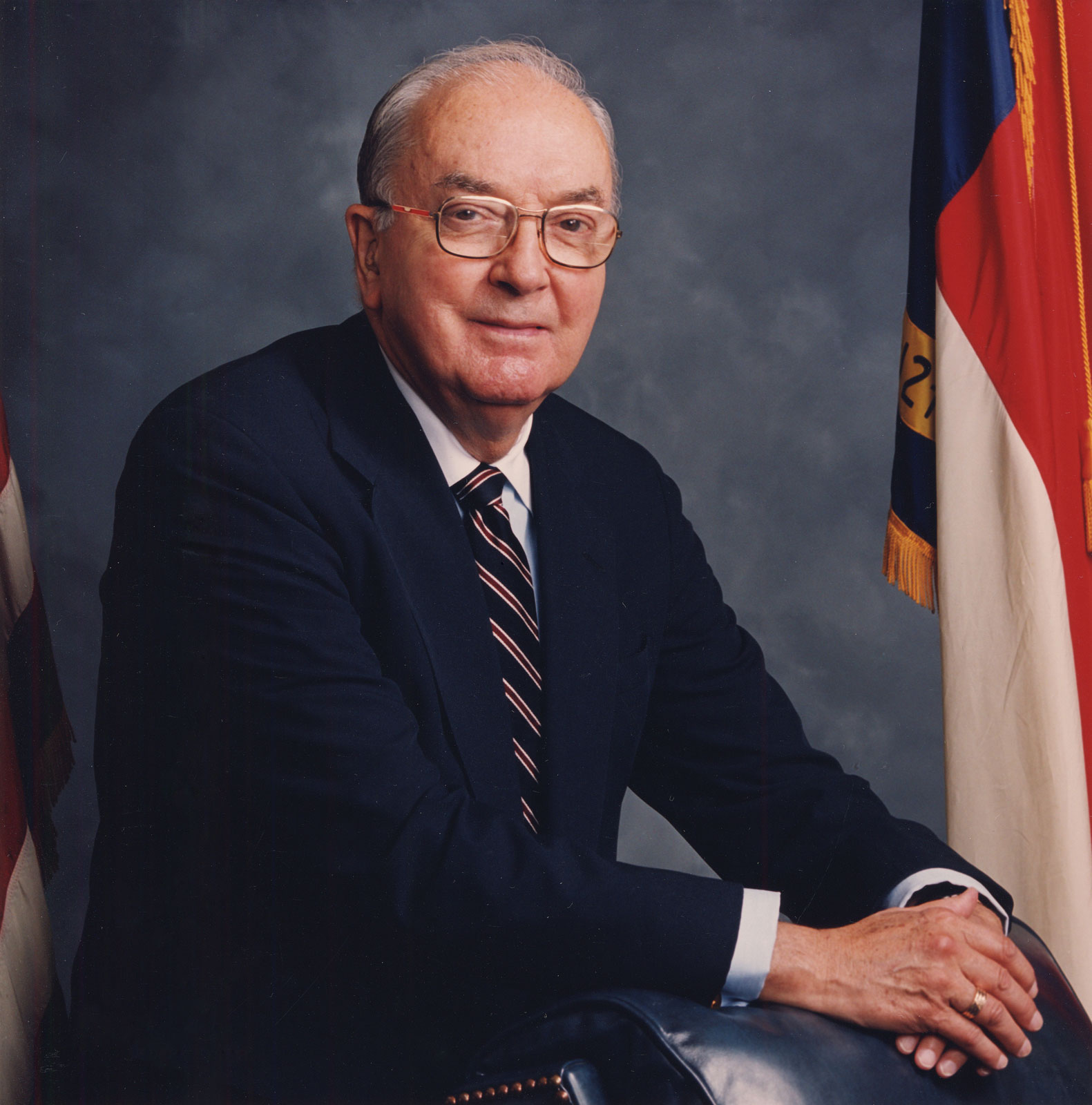
North Carolina Senator Jesse Helms

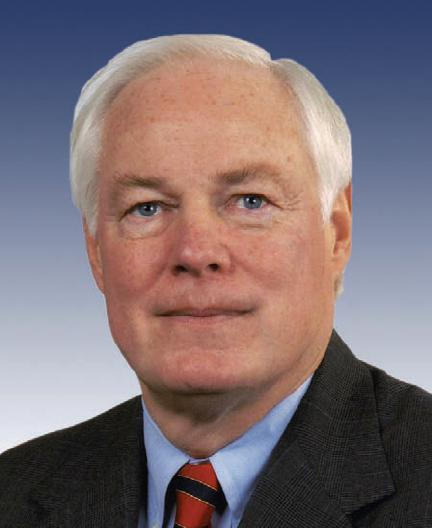
Iowa Representative Jim Leach

On April 19, 1978, the United States Treasury Department announced that a portion of the national gold stockpile was to be auctioned through the General Services Administration (GSA) beginning on May 23, 1978, in the form of 400 troy ounces (12 kg) bars. According to the Treasury, the sales were intended to "[reduce] the U.S. trade deficit, either by increasing the exports of gold or by reducing the imports of this commodity", and to "further the U.S. desire to continue progress toward the elimination of the international monetary role of gold". For reasons of bookkeeping, an entire bar was set as the minimum purchase, which placed the gold outside of the reach of most Americans. North Carolina senator Jesse Helms was critical of the plan, saying that he was "opposed to the sale of U.S. gold to foreign and international banks and gold dealers" and that medallions should be "produced in small size, suitable for sale to average citizens". On the day of the Treasury announcement, Helms introduced the Gold Medallion Act of 1978. The stated intent was to provide average consumers with affordable, small-sized gold bullion to compete with the South African Krugerrand and other world bullion coins, which were becoming increasingly popular with American investors. 1.6 million troy ounces (50,000 kg) ounces of gold had been imported into the United States in the form of Krugerrands in 1977 alone. In a hearing on August 25, 1978, before the United States Senate Committee on Banking, Housing, and Urban Affairs, Helms said:

In the first year after enactment the bill would require that the first 1.5 million ounces of gold sold be made into medallions. Under the stepped-up rate of gold sales, that is only two months worth of gold. The amount is about equal to last year's importation of foreign bullion coins, mostly Krugerrands from South Africa.

Helms went on to describe the characteristics of the proposed medallions, stating:

The one-ounce medallion would have on one side the head of the statue of Freedom atop the Capitol, and it would be marked with the words, "One ounce fine gold", and the word "freedom". The reverse of the piece would be the Great Seal of the United States and the words "United States of America", and the year in which it was produced. The half-ounce medallion would have on one side some representation of the rights of individuals and the words "Human Rights", and "One-half ounce fine gold". The reverse would be similar to the back side of the "Freedom" medallion, with the Great Seal.

Support for the medallions grew in Congress, prompting the introduction of more legislation. Iowa representative Jim Leach proposed that the series feature designs honoring American artists. During the Committee on Banking, Housing and Urban Affairs hearing, Leach outlined the reasons for his proposal. He noted that the House Subcommittee on Historic Preservation received many suggestions of individuals worthy to appear on the dollar coin that had previously been proposed. (Note: Social reformer Susan B. Anthony was later chosen to be depicted on a coin known as the Susan B. Anthony dollar.) Leach felt that a dollar coin was not a suitable way to commemorate the individuals, as it was impossible to honor such a large group on a coin whose design was likely to remain unchanged for a long period of time. He also noted that all United States coinage until then had depicted individuals whose principal contributions had been in government and politics rather than the arts. Leach described the specifics of his proposal, stating:

I am suggesting in H.R. 13567 that we honor 10 individuals who have been distinguished contributors to the arts—music, painting, writing, architecture and the theatre. Other fields might well be chosen, or other people than I have selected within the field of arts; but the point I want to emphasize is this: while our coinage is and should be devoted to honoring those who have contributed to our political heritage, medals offer us an opportunity to honor those who have contributed to our cultural development, our economic achievements, our technological expertise, and other accomplishments which reflect the wide dimensions of our democratic society.

The subjects designated were painter Grant Wood, contralto singer Marian Anderson, authors Mark Twain and Willa Cather, musician Louis Armstrong, architect Frank Lloyd Wright, poet Robert Frost, sculptor Alexander Calder, actress Helen Hayes and author John Steinbeck.

Though the program received widespread support in Congress, Treasury officials opposed it. In a letter, Treasury secretary W. Michael Blumenthal wrote, "I do not believe the U.S. Government should permit the erroneous impression to be created that it cannot or will not take the necessary steps to combat inflation and that the public therefore needs to buy gold as a hedge against inflation." Blumenthal also believed that if the government were to sanction the striking of gold medallions, the public would believe that the Treasury was actively encouraging investment in gold. Despite these objections, the bill was attached to the bank omnibus bill, which President Jimmy Carter signed into law on November 10, 1978.

== Production and sale ==
The Treasury lacked money to put the medallions into production, so an appropriations bill was passed giving the department the necessary funding. The GSA was tasked with determining how best to market the new issues. The GSA proposed several sales plans, including the distribution of the medallions to a network of banks for sale to the public. This was rejected in favor of requiring purchasers to make a telephone call to learn the price of the medallions on the day of purchase, after which the purchaser was to go to a post office the same day to make payment. According to the legislation, the issues were to be "sold to the general public at a competitive price equal to the free market value of the gold contained therein plus the cost of manufacture, including labor, materials, dies, use of machinery, and overhead expenses including marketing costs".

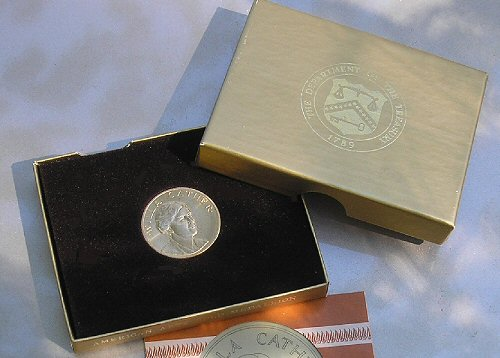
A half-ounce medallion depicting Willa Cather, in original box of issue

Production began in 1980. Struck at the West Point Bullion Depository, the medallions contained 90% gold, and were issued in two sizes: one containing one troy ounce (31 g) of gold and one containing one half-ounce (16 g) of the metal. The first struck were those honoring Grant Wood on the one ounce medallion and Marian Anderson on the half-ounce piece. Both were designed by United States Mint Chief Engraver Frank Gasparro. Sales were poor, and in September 1980, the Mint announced that a private firm, commodity traders J. Aron and Company, would market the medallions. The new plan involved selling the medallions through a network of bullion dealers, banks, brokerage houses and coin dealers, a system similar to that South Africa used to distribute the Krugerrand in the US. In 1981, the second year of production, the composition of the medallions was changed; although the 90% gold purity was retained, the balance was altered to include silver, which was added to change their appearance. That year's medallions depicted Mark Twain and Willa Cather. These were designed by Matthew Poloso and Sherl Winter, respectively. These first four medallions bore no notation of their metallic content or country of origin. This was done to distinguish them from federal coinage. Beginning in 1982, this information and small, toothlike designs, known as "denticles", were added along the inner rim of the medallions, and reeding was added to the edge. That year's issues depicted Louis Armstrong, as designed by John Mercanti, and Frank Lloyd Wright, designed by Edgar Steever. The following year's medallions depicted Robert Frost and Alexander Calder. The former was designed by P. Fowler, while the latter was by Michael Iacocca. The final year of production saw the mintage of medallions with designs by John Mercanti honoring Helen Hayes and John Steinbeck. The Mint terminated the contract with J. Aron and Company in 1984, opting instead to sell the medallions through a telemarketing program. In 1985, Mint director Donna Pope announced that the medallions would be sold in another telemarketing operation in sets of five of either one each of the one ounce medallions or one each of the half-ounce pieces, beginning in September of that year and ending on December 31, or sooner if all sets sold.

== Reception ==
In October 1980, Luis Vigdor, assistant vice-president for bullion and numismatic operations of Manfra, Tordella & Brookes, then one of the largest coin firms in the country, compared the medallions and the efforts to market them unfavorably to the South African Krugerrand. According to Vigdor, they were difficult to market due to their lack of notation of weight, fineness and country of origin. He also criticized the marketing, asserting that people were unlikely to buy gold at the post office, and that the medallions were advertised poorly. Vigdor contrasted the medallions' marketing program with the widespread success of the Krugerrand and the vigorous attempts to market them around the world. Commenting on the poor sale of the medallions, assistant director of marketing for the Mint Francis Frere said in 1984: "it just hasn't worked. They're not selling. We've made a strong effort, but it's not working."

On February 12, 1982, following the poor sales of the medallions, the United States Gold Commission recommended the minting of a gold coin. Donald Regan, Secretary of the Treasury and chairman of the commission, later told reporters that a gold coin could be easier to sell than medallions, because the suggested coins "could be redeemable in dollars". The Mint issued gold coins for the 1984 Summer Olympics in Los Angeles and for the centennial of the Statue of Liberty in 1986. Both issues were successful, and the Liberty piece sold out on advance sales. As the public was receptive to the gold coins, and President Ronald Reagan had banned the importation of Krugerrands in 1985 over South Africa's apartheid policy, Congress authorized the American Gold Eagle gold bullion coin, which entered production as legal tender in 1986.

== Designs and sales figures ==
Obverse and reverse designs
A gold medallion depicting a man and a painting	A gold medallion depicting a woman and cupped hands holding a globe	A gold medallion depicting a man and a steamship	A gold medallion depicting the bust of a woman and a woman pushing a plow	A gold medallion depicting a man and a trumpet with musical notes
1980 one ounce medallion, depicting painter Grant Wood	1980 half-ounce medallion, depicting singer Marian Anderson	1981 one ounce medallion, depicting author Mark Twain	1981 half-ounce medallion, depicting author Willa Cather	1982 one ounce medallion, depicting musician Louis Armstrong
A gold medallion depicting a man and building	A gold medallion depicting a man and text	A gold medallion depicting a man and a mobile	A gold medallion depicting a woman and comedy and tragedy masks	A gold medallion depicting a man and a rural farm scene
1982 half-ounce medallion, depicting architect Frank Lloyd Wright	1983 one ounce medallion, depicting poet Robert Frost	1983 half-ounce medallion, depicting sculptor Alexander Calder	1984 one ounce medallion, depicting actress Helen Hayes	1984 half-ounce medallion, depicting author John Steinbeck

Designs and sales figures of the American Arts Commemorative Series medallions
Year	Gold content	Obverse design	Obverse inscription	Reverse design	Reverse inscription	Designer	Number minted	Number sold
1980	1 troy ounce (31 g)	Portrait of Grant Wood	GRANT WOOD	American Gothic	AMERICAN ARTS COMMEMORATIVE SERIES – 1980	Frank Gasparro	500,000	312,709
1980	0.5 troy ounces (16 g)	Portrait of Marian Anderson	MARIAN ANDERSON	Cupped hands holding globe	AMERICAN ARTS COMMEMORATIVE SERIES – 1980	Frank Gasparro	1,000,000	281,624
1981	1 troy ounce (31 g)	Portrait of Mark Twain	MARK TWAIN	Steamboat	AMERICAN ARTS COMMEMORATIVE SERIES – 1981	Matthew Peloso	141,000	116,371
1981	0.5 troy ounces (16 g)	Portrait of Willa Cather	WILLA CATHER	Woman operating a field plow	AMERICAN ARTS COMMEMORATIVE SERIES – 1981	Sherl Winter	200,000	97,331
1982	1 troy ounce (31 g)	Portrait of Louis Armstrong	UNITED STATES OF AMERICA – 1982 – LOUIS ARMSTRONG	Trumpet and musical notes	AMERICAN ARTS COMMEMORATIVE SERIES – AMBASSADOR OF JAZZ – ONE OUNCE GOLD	John Mercanti	420,000	409,098
1982	0.5 troy ounces (16 g)	Portrait of Frank Lloyd Wright	UNITED STATES OF AMERICA – 1982 – FRANK LLOYD WRIGHT	Landscape around Fallingwater	AMERICAN ARTS COMMEMORATIVE SERIES – ONE HALF OUNCE GOLD	Edgar J. Steever	360,000	348,305
1983	1 troy ounce (31 g)	Portrait of Robert Frost	UNITED STATES OF AMERICA – 1983 – ROBERT FROST	Excerpt of Frost's "The Road Not Taken"	AMERICAN ARTS COMMEMORATIVE SERIES – TWO ROADS DIVERGED IN A WOOD, AND I-/ I TOOK THE ONE LESS TRAVELED BY,/ AND THAT HAS MADE ALL THE DIFFERENCE – ONE OUNCE GOLD	P. Fowler	500,000	390,669
1983	0.5 troy ounces (16 g)	Portrait of Alexander Calder	UNITED STATES OF AMERICA – 1983 – ALEXANDER CALDER	Mobile	AMERICAN ARTS COMMEMORATIVE SERIES – ONE HALF OUNCE GOLD	Michael Iacocca	410,000	75,571
1984	1 troy ounce (31 g)	Portrait of Helen Hayes	UNITED STATES OF AMERICA – 1984 – HELEN HAYES	Masks of comedy and drama surrounded by ribbon	AMERICAN ARTS COMMEMORATIVE SERIES – FIRST LADY OF THE STAGE – ONE OUNCE GOLD	John Mercanti	35,000	33,546
1984	0.5 troy ounces (16 g)	Portrait of John Steinbeck	UNITED STATES OF AMERICA – 1984 – JOHN STEINBECK	Rural farm	AMERICAN ARTS COMMEMORATIVE SERIES – ONE HALF OUNCE GOLD	John Mercanti	35,000	32,572

== Bibliography ==
- "Mint Cancels Plan to Sell Medallions". The Fort Scott Tribune. Fort Scott, Kansas. Associated Press. June 26, 1984. p. 10.
- "Panel Urges U.S. Mint Gold Coin". The Lakeland Ledger. Lakeland, Florida. Associated Press. February 13, 1982. p. 7B.
- Deisher, Beth; Gibbs, William T., eds. (2011). Coin World Almanac (8th ed.). Sidney, Ohio: Amos Press. ISBN 978-0-944945-60-5.
- Department of the Treasury (September 10, 1985). "Mint Director Donna Pope Announces the Sale of Gold Medallions in 'Sets Only'" (PDF) (Press release). Archived from the original (PDF) on October 9, 2012.
- Department of the Treasury (April 19, 1978). "Sale of Gold by the U.S. Treasury (Sale for Dollars)" (PDF) (Press release). Archived from the original (PDF) on October 9, 2012.
- Department of the Treasury (September 25, 1980). "Sale of Gold Medallions Extended until December 31" (PDF) (Press release). Archived from the original (PDF) on October 9, 2012.
- Egan, Jack (October 20, 1980). "The Bottom Line". New York. 13 (41): 14, 16.
- Ganz, David (January 1979). "U.S. Mint Returns to Gold". COINage. Encino, California: Behn-Miller Publishers: 68–70.
- Gilkes, Paul (August 2010). "Gold Medallions Launching Pad for Future Bullion Programs". Coin World. Sidney, Ohio: Amos Press: 102–103, 201.
- Pope, Donna (1981). Annual Report of the Director of the United States Mint (Report). U.S. Government Printing Office.
- Reed, P. Bradley, ed. (1990). Coin World Almanac (6th ed.). New York, New York: World Almanac. ISBN 978-0-88687-460-5.
- United States Senate (1978). Treasury Sale of U.S. Gold and the Gold Medallion Act of 1978. Washington, D.C.: U.S. Government Printing Office.
- Yeoman, R.S. (2008). A Guide Book of United States Coins (62nd ed.). Atlanta, Georgia: Whitman Publishing. ISBN 978-0-7948-2491-4.
