= Coins of the United States dollar =

Coins of the United States dollar – aside from those of the earlier Continental currency – were first minted in 1792. New coins have been produced annually and they comprise a significant aspect of the United States currency system. Circulating coins exist in denominations of 1¢ (i.e. 1 cent or $0.01), 5¢, 10¢, 25¢, 50¢, and $1.00. Also minted are bullion, including gold, silver and platinum, and commemorative coins. All of these are produced by the United States Mint. The coins are then sold to Federal Reserve Banks which in turn put coins into circulation and withdraw them as demanded by the United States economy.

== Current coinage ==
Four mints currently operate in the United States, producing billions of coins each year. The main mint is the Philadelphia Mint, which produces circulating coinage, mint sets and commemorative coins. The Denver Mint also produces circulating coinage, mint sets and commemoratives. The San Francisco Mint produces regular and silver proof coinage, and produced circulating coinage until the 1970s. The West Point Mint produces bullion coinage (including proofs). Philadelphia and Denver produce the dies used at all of the mints. The proof and mint sets are manufactured each year and contain examples of all of the year's circulating coins.

The producing mint of each coin may be easily identified, as most coins bear a mint mark. The identifying letter of the mint can be found on the front side of most coins, and is often placed near the year. Unmarked coins are issued by the Philadelphia mint. Among marked coins, Philadelphia coins bear a letter P. Denver coins bear a letter D, San Francisco coins bear a letter S, and West Point coins bear a letter W. S and W coins are rarely found in general circulation, although S coins bearing dates prior to the mid-1970s are in circulation. The CC, O, C, and D mint marks were used on gold and silver coins for various periods from the mid-19th century until the early 20th century by temporary mints in Carson City, Nevada; New Orleans, Louisiana; Charlotte, North Carolina; and Dahlonega, Georgia. Most such coins that still exist are now in the hands of collectors and museums.

=== Coins in circulation ===
Value	Image		Specifications				Description			Minted	Usage	Common name
Value	Obverse	Reverse	Diameter	Thickness	Mass	Composition	Edge	Obverse	Reverse	Minted	Usage	Common name
1¢			19.05 mm (0.750 in)	1.52 mm (0.060 in)	1909–1942; 3.11 g (48.0 gr)	copper 95% tin/zinc 5%	plain	Abraham Lincoln	Wheat	1909–1958	wide^{2}	wheat cent, wheat penny, wheatie
1¢			19.05 mm (0.750 in)	1.52 mm (0.060 in)	1943: ?	steel/zinc^{1}	plain	Abraham Lincoln	Wheat	1909–1958	rare^{2}	wheat cent, wheat penny, wheatie
1¢			19.05 mm (0.750 in)	1.52 mm (0.060 in)	1944–1946: ?	salvaged brass composition^{1}	plain	Abraham Lincoln	Wheat	1909–1958	wide^{2}	wheat cent, wheat penny, wheatie
1¢			19.05 mm (0.750 in)	1.52 mm (0.060 in)	1947–1982; 3.11 g (48.0 gr)	copper 95% tin/zinc 5%	plain	Abraham Lincoln	Wheat	1909–1958	wide^{2}	wheat cent, wheat penny, wheatie
1¢			19.05 mm (0.750 in)	1.52 mm (0.060 in)	1947–1982; 3.11 g (48.0 gr)	copper 95% tin/zinc 5%	plain	Abraham Lincoln	Lincoln Memorial	1959–2008	wide	cent, penny
1¢			19.05 mm (0.750 in)	1.52 mm (0.060 in)	1982–present 2.50 g (38 gr)	Core: zinc 97.5% Plating: copper 2.5%^{1}	plain	Abraham Lincoln	Lincoln Memorial	1959–2008	wide	cent, penny
1¢		see article: Lincoln Bicentennial cents (2009)	19.05 mm (0.750 in)	1.52 mm (0.060 in)	1982–present 2.50 g (38 gr)	Core: zinc 97.5% Plating: copper 2.5%^{1}	plain	Abraham Lincoln	Lincoln bicentennial designs	2009	wide	cent, penny
1¢			19.05 mm (0.750 in)	1.52 mm (0.060 in)	1982–present 2.50 g (38 gr)	Core: zinc 97.5% Plating: copper 2.5%^{1}	plain	Abraham Lincoln	Union shield	2010–present (after 2025 not for circulation)	wide	cent, penny
5¢			21.21 mm (0.835 in)	1.95 mm (0.077 in)	5.000 g (77.16 gr)	copper 75% nickel 25%^{3}	plain	Thomas Jefferson (profile)	Monticello	1938–2003	wide	nickel
5¢	see article: Westward Journey nickel		21.21 mm (0.835 in)	1.95 mm (0.077 in)	5.000 g (77.16 gr)	copper 75% nickel 25%^{3}	plain	Lewis & Clark bicentennial designs		2004–2005	wide	nickel
5¢			21.21 mm (0.835 in)	1.95 mm (0.077 in)	5.000 g (77.16 gr)	copper 75% nickel 25%^{3}	plain	Thomas Jefferson (portrait)	Monticello	2006–present	wide	nickel
10¢			17.91 mm (0.705 in)	1.35 mm (0.053 in)	2.268 g (35.00 gr)	Core: copper 100% Plating: copper 75% nickel 25% Overall: copper 91.67% nickel 8.33%^{4}	118 reeds	Franklin D. Roosevelt	torch, oak branch, olive branch	1946–present	wide	dime
10¢	see article:United States Semiquincentennial coinage		17.91 mm (0.705 in)	1.35 mm (0.053 in)	2.268 g (35.00 gr)	Core: copper 100% Plating: copper 75% nickel 25% Overall: copper 91.67% nickel 8.33%^{4}	118 reeds	Liberty	Eagle clutching arrows	2026	wide	dime
25¢			24.26 mm (0.955 in)	1.75 mm (0.069 in)	5.670 g (87.50 gr)	Core: copper 100% Plating: copper 75% nickel 25% Overall: copper 91.67% nickel 8.33%^{4}	119 reeds	George Washington	Bald eagle	1932–1974, 1977–1998^{5}	wide	quarter, quarter dollar
25¢			24.26 mm (0.955 in)	1.75 mm (0.069 in)	5.670 g (87.50 gr)	Core: copper 100% Plating: copper 75% nickel 25% Overall: copper 91.67% nickel 8.33%^{4}	119 reeds	George Washington	Bicentennial colonial military drummer	(1975) 1976^{5}	wide	quarter, quarter dollar
25¢			24.26 mm (0.955 in)	1.75 mm (0.069 in)	5.670 g (87.50 gr)	Core: copper 100% Plating: copper 75% nickel 25% Overall: copper 91.67% nickel 8.33%^{4}	119 reeds	George Washington	Washington crossing the Delaware	2021	wide	quarter, quarter dollar
25¢		see article: 50 State quarters	24.26 mm (0.955 in)	1.75 mm (0.069 in)	5.670 g (87.50 gr)	Core: copper 100% Plating: copper 75% nickel 25% Overall: copper 91.67% nickel 8.33%^{4}	119 reeds	George Washington	State Quarter Series	1999–2008	wide	quarter, quarter dollar
25¢		see article: D.C. and U.S. Territories quarters	24.26 mm (0.955 in)	1.75 mm (0.069 in)	5.670 g (87.50 gr)	Core: copper 100% Plating: copper 75% nickel 25% Overall: copper 91.67% nickel 8.33%^{4}	119 reeds	George Washington	D.C. and U. S. Territories Quarters	2009	wide	quarter, quarter dollar
25¢		see article: America the Beautiful quarters	24.26 mm (0.955 in)	1.75 mm (0.069 in)	5.670 g (87.50 gr)	Core: copper 100% Plating: copper 75% nickel 25% Overall: copper 91.67% nickel 8.33%^{4}	119 reeds	George Washington	America the Beautiful Quarters	2010–2021	wide	quarter, quarter dollar
25¢		see article: American Women quarters	24.26 mm (0.955 in)	1.75 mm (0.069 in)	5.670 g (87.50 gr)	Core: copper 100% Plating: copper 75% nickel 25% Overall: copper 91.67% nickel 8.33%^{4}	119 reeds	George Washington	American Women quarters	2022–2025	wide	quarter, quarter dollar
25¢	see article:United States Semiquincentennial coinage		24.26 mm (0.955 in)	1.75 mm (0.069 in)	5.670 g (87.50 gr)	Core: copper 100% Plating: copper 75% nickel 25% Overall: copper 91.67% nickel 8.33%^{4}	119 reeds	Semiquincentennial Designs		2026	wide	quarter, quarter dollar
50¢			30.61 mm (1.205 in)	2.15 mm (0.085 in)	11.34 g (175.0 gr)	Core: copper 100% Plating: copper 75% nickel 25% Overall: copper 91.67% nickel 8.33%^{4}	150 reeds	John F. Kennedy	Seal of the president of the United States surrounded by 50 stars	1964–1974, 1977–present^{5}	limited^{6}	half, half dollar, 50-cent piece
50¢			30.61 mm (1.205 in)	2.15 mm (0.085 in)	11.34 g (175.0 gr)	Core: copper 100% Plating: copper 75% nickel 25% Overall: copper 91.67% nickel 8.33%^{4}	150 reeds	John F. Kennedy	Independence Hall	(1975) 1976^{5}	limited^{6}	half, half dollar, 50-cent piece
50¢	see article:United States Semiquincentennial coinage		30.61 mm (1.205 in)	2.15 mm (0.085 in)	11.34 g (175.0 gr)	Core: copper 100% Plating: copper 75% nickel 25% Overall: copper 91.67% nickel 8.33%^{4}	150 reeds	Statue of Liberty	Hands passing Liberty's torch	2026	limited^{6}	half, half dollar, 50-cent piece
$1			38.1 mm (1.500 in)	2.58 mm (0.102 in)	22.68 g (0.8 oz) (350 gr)	Core: copper 100% Plating: copper 75% nickel 25% Overall: copper 91.67% nickel 8.33%^{4}	reeded	Dwight D. Eisenhower	Apollo 11 mission insignia	1971–1974, 1977–1978	limited	large dollar, Ike dollar, silver dollar
$1			38.1 mm (1.500 in)	2.58 mm (0.102 in)	22.68 g (0.8 oz) (350 gr)	Core: copper 100% Plating: copper 75% nickel 25% Overall: copper 91.67% nickel 8.33%^{4}	reeded	Dwight D. Eisenhower	Liberty Bell superimposed over the Moon	1975–1976	limited	large dollar, Ike dollar, silver dollar
$1			26.50 mm (1.043 in)	2.00 mm (0.079 in)	8.10 g (125 gr)		reeded	Susan B. Anthony	Apollo 11 mission insignia	1979–1981, 1999^{8}	limited	SBA, Suzie B., Anthony, silver dollar
$1			26.49 mm (1.043 in)	2.00 mm (0.079 in)	8.10 g (125 gr)	Core: 100% Cu; Cladding: 77% Cu, 12% Zn, 7% Mn, 4% Ni; Overall: 88.5% Cu, 6% Zn, 3.5% Mn, 2% Ni	plain	Sacagawea	Bald eagle in flight	2000–2008	limited^{7}	dollar coin, gold(en) dollar, Sacagawea
$1		see article: Native American redesign (2009–present)	26.49 mm (1.043 in)	2.00 mm (0.079 in)	8.10 g (125 gr)	Core: 100% Cu; Cladding: 77% Cu, 12% Zn, 7% Mn, 4% Ni; Overall: 88.5% Cu, 6% Zn, 3.5% Mn, 2% Ni	incused inscriptions	Sacagawea	Native American Themes	2009–present (after 2012 not for circulation)	limited^{7}	dollar coin, gold(en) dollar, Sacagawea
$1	see article: Presidential dollar coins^{7}		26.49 mm (1.043 in)	2.00 mm (0.079 in)	8.10 g (125 gr)	Core: 100% Cu; Cladding: 77% Cu, 12% Zn, 7% Mn, 4% Ni; Overall: 88.5% Cu, 6% Zn, 3.5% Mn, 2% Ni	incused inscriptions	Each deceased president	Statue of Liberty	2007–2016, 2020 (after 2012 not for circulation)	limited^{7}	dollar coin, gold(en) dollar
$1		see article: American Innovation dollars^{9}	26.49 mm (1.043 in)	2.00 mm (0.079 in)	8.10 g (125 gr)	Core: 100% Cu; Cladding: 77% Cu, 12% Zn, 7% Mn, 4% Ni; Overall: 88.5% Cu, 6% Zn, 3.5% Mn, 2% Ni	incused inscriptions	Statue of Liberty^{10}	Various designs, honoring an innovation or innovator from each state	2018–2032 (not currently circulated)	limited^{7}	dollar coin, gold(en) dollar
These images are to scale at 2.5 pixels per millimetre. For table standards, see the coin specification table.

==== Remarks ====
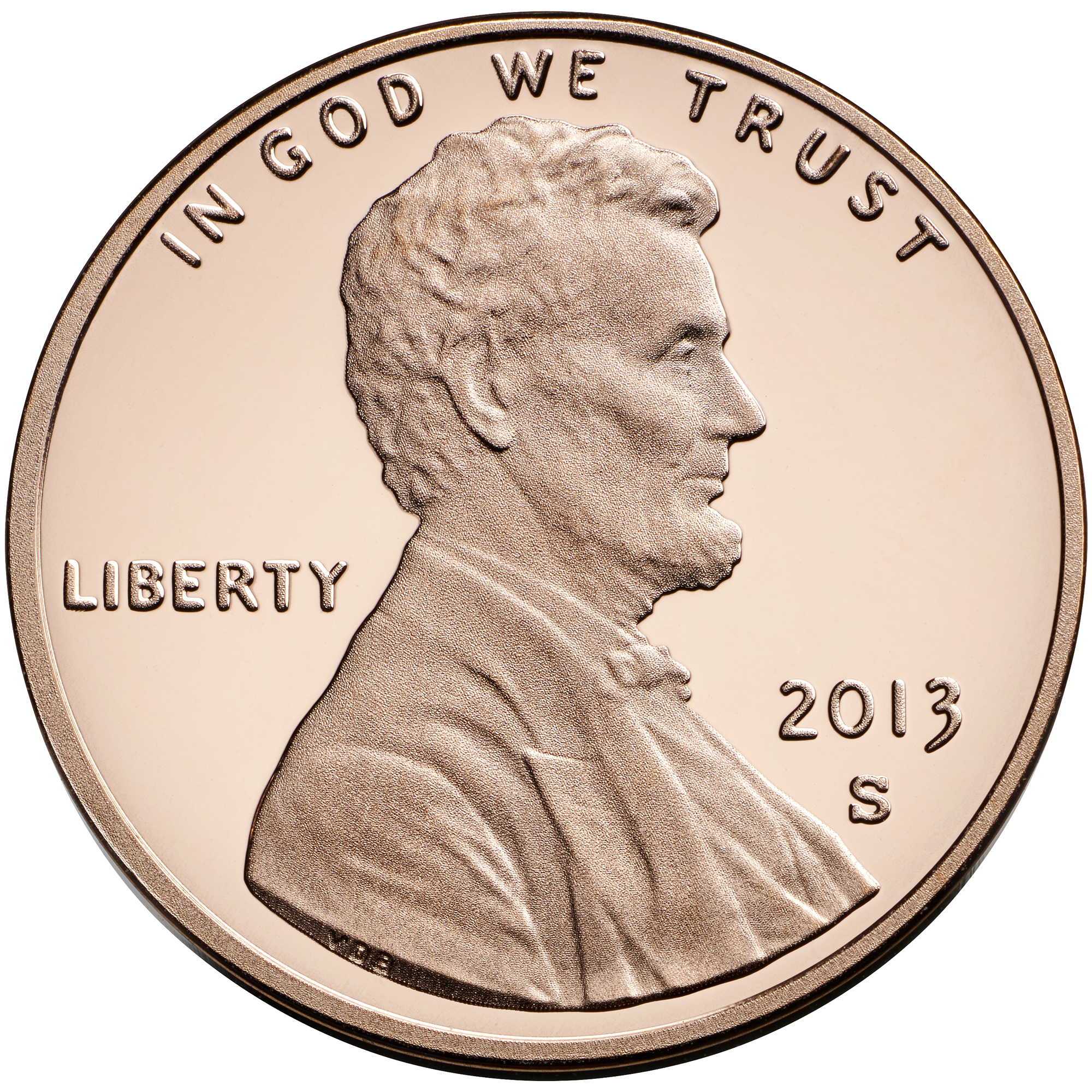

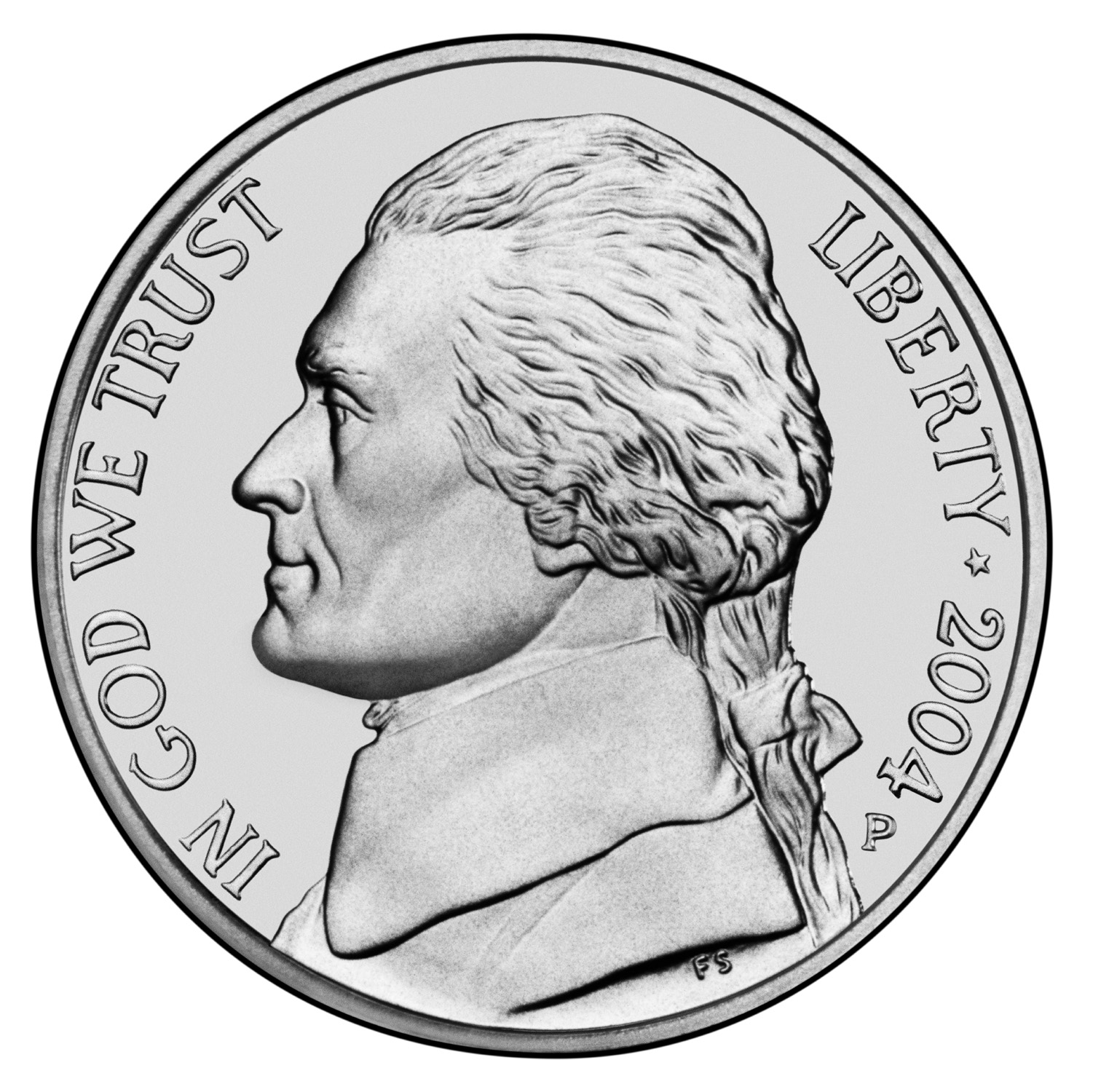

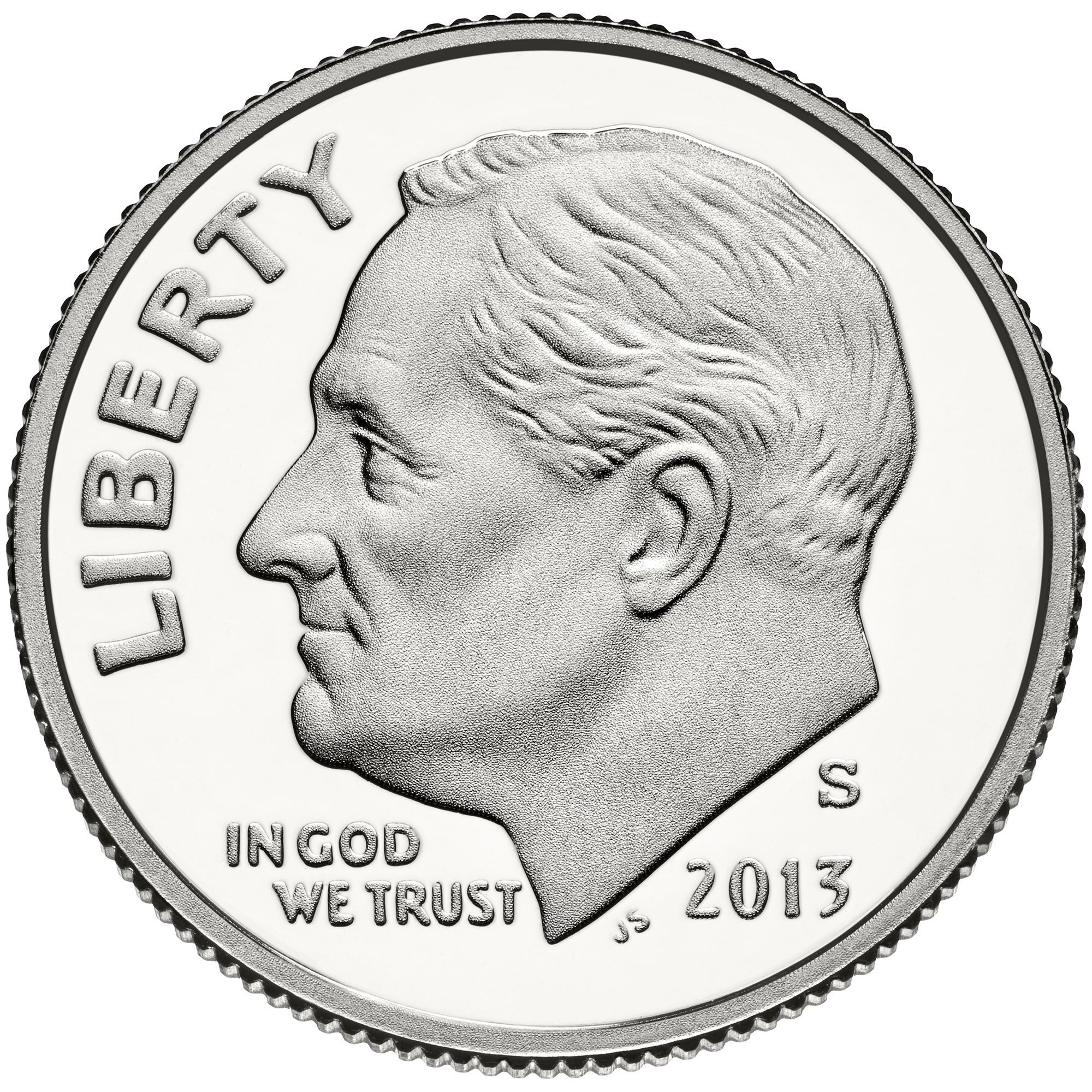

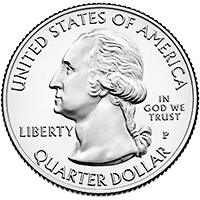

1. The mass and composition of the cent changed to the current copper-plated zinc core in 1982. Both types were minted in 1982 with no distinguishing mark. Cents minted in 1943 were struck on planchets punched from zinc-coated steel which left the resulting edges uncoated. This caused many of these coins to rust. These "steel pennies" are not likely to be found in circulation today, as they were later intentionally removed from circulation for recycling the metal and by collectors. However, cents minted from 1944 to 1946 were made from salvaged WWII ammunition shells, making a special brass composition to replace the steel cents, but still save material for the war effort, and are more common in circulation than their 1943 counterparts. Starting 2026, pennies are minted only for collectible sets due to cost. In 2025, the Mint produced 232 three-coin sets, each containing an Omega (Ω) privy-marked circulating cent from Philadelphia, another from Denver, and a 24-karat gold cent struck in Philadelphia, commemorating the end of the cent's production for circulation.
2. The wheat cent was mainstream and common during its time. Some dates are rare, but many can still be found in circulation. This is partially due to the fact that unlike the formerly silver denominations (dollar, half dollar, quarter, and dime), the composition of the pre-1982 cent, nearly pure copper, is not so much more valuable over face value for it to be hoarded to the extreme extent of the silver denominations.
3. Nickels produced from mid-1942 through 1945 were manufactured from 56% copper, 35% silver and 9% manganese. This allowed the saved nickel metal to be shifted to industrial production of military supplies during World War II. Few of these are still found in circulation.
4. Prior to 1965 and passage of the Coinage Act of 1965 the composition of the dime, quarter, half-dollar and dollar coins was 90% silver and 10% copper. The half-dollar continued to be minted in a 40% silver-clad composition between 1965 and 1970. Dimes and quarters from before 1965 and half-dollars from before 1971 are generally not in circulation due to being removed for their silver content. Some modern commemorative coins have been minted in the silver dollar denominations of varying purities.
5. In 1975 and 1976 U.S. Bicentennial coinage was minted. Regardless of date of coining, each coin bears the dual date "1776-1976". The Quarter-Dollar, Half-Dollar and Dollar coins were issued in the copper 91.67% nickel 8.33% composition for general circulation and the Government issued six-coin Proof Set. A special three-coin set of 40% silver coins were also issued by the U.S. Mint in both Uncirculated and Proof.
6. Use of the half-dollar is not as widespread as that of other coins in general circulation; most Americans use quarters, dimes, nickels and cents only, as these are the coins most often found in general circulation. When found, many 50¢ coins are quickly hoarded, spent, or brought to banks. They are often sought after by coin roll hunters for the purpose of searching for silver coins, proofs, and coins not intended for circulation.
7. The Presidential Dollar series features portraits of all deceased U.S. Presidents (with the exception of Jimmy Carter) with four coin designs issued each year in the order of the president's inauguration date from 2007 to 2016 and then one coin design in 2020 for president George H. W. Bush who died after the original program ended. These coins began circulating on February 15, 2007. Starting 2012, these coins have been minted only for collectible sets because of a large stockpile. For new presidents to be eligible for a coin design, they must have been deceased for at least two years prior to the time of minting.
8. The Susan B. Anthony dollar coin was minted from 1979 to 1981 and 1999. The 1999 minting was in response to Treasury supplies of the dollar becoming depleted and the inability to accelerate the minting of the Sacagawea dollars by a year. 1981 Anthony dollars can sometimes be found in circulation from proof sets that were broken open, but these dollars were not intended for circulation.
9. Since 2019, each American Innovation dollar coin features a different privy mark, changed annually, located just below "IN GOD WE TRUST".

=== Bullion coins ===
Non-circulating bullion coins have been produced each year since 1986. They can be found in gold, silver, platinum (since 1997), and palladium (since 2017). The face value of these coins is legal as tender, but does not actually reflect the value of the precious metal contained therein. On May 11, 2011, Utah became the first state to accept these coins as the value of the precious metal in common transactions. The Utah State Treasurer assigns a numerical precious metal value to these coins each week based on the spot metal prices. The bullion coin types include "S" (San Francisco, 1986–1992), "P" (Philadelphia, 1993–2000), and "W" (West Point, New York, 2001–present).

Metal	Type	Face Value	Images		Specifications			
Metal	Type	Face Value	Obverse	Reverse	Diameter	Fineness	Content	Dates
Silver	America the Beautiful silver bullion coins	25¢	See article: America the Beautiful quarters		76.2 mm	999 fine	5.00 ozt (155.52 g)	2010–2021
Silver	American Silver Eagle	$1			40.6 mm	999 fine	1.00 ozt (31.10 g)	1986–2021
Silver	American Silver Eagle	$1			40.6 mm	999 fine	1.00 ozt (31.10 g)	2021 – present
Gold	American Gold Eagle	$5			16.5 mm	916 fine (22 karat)	0.10 ozt (3.11 g)	1986–2021
Gold	American Gold Eagle	$5			16.5 mm	916 fine (22 karat)	0.10 ozt (3.11 g)	2021 – present
Gold	American Gold Eagle	$10			22.0 mm	916 fine (22 karat)	0.25 ozt (7.78 g)	1986–2021
Gold	American Gold Eagle	$10			22.0 mm	916 fine (22 karat)	0.25 ozt (7.78 g)	2021 – present
Gold	American Gold Eagle	$25			27.0 mm	916 fine (22 karat)	0.50 ozt (15.55 g)	1986–2021
Gold	American Gold Eagle	$25			27.0 mm	916 fine (22 karat)	0.50 ozt (15.55 g)	2021 – present
Gold	American Gold Eagle	$50			32.7 mm	916 fine (22 karat)	1.00 ozt (31.10 g)	1986–2021
Gold	American Gold Eagle	$50			32.7 mm	916 fine (22 karat)	1.00 ozt (31.10 g)	2021 – present
Gold	American Buffalo	$5			16.5 mm	999.9 fine (24 karat)	0.10 ozt (3.11 g)	2008
Gold	American Buffalo	$10			22.0 mm	999.9 fine (24 karat)	0.25 ozt (7.78 g)	2008
Gold	American Buffalo	$25			27.0 mm	999.9 fine (24 karat)	0.50 ozt (15.55 g)	2008
Gold	American Buffalo	$50			32.7 mm	999.9 fine (24 karat)	1.00 ozt (31.10 g)	2006 – present
Gold	American Liberty high relief gold coin	$100	see article: American Liberty high relief gold coin		30.61 mm	999.9 fine (24 karat)	1.00 ozt (31.10 g)	2015 – present
Platinum	American Platinum Eagle	$10			16.5 mm	999.5 fine	0.10 ozt (3.11 g)	1997–2008
Platinum	American Platinum Eagle	$25			22.0 mm	999.5 fine	0.25 ozt (7.78 g)	1997–2008
Platinum	American Platinum Eagle	$50			27.0 mm	999.5 fine	0.50 ozt (15.55 g)	1997–2008
Platinum	American Platinum Eagle	$100			32.7 mm	999.5 fine	1.00 ozt (31.10 g)	1997 – present
Palladium	American Palladium Eagle	$25			32.7 mm	999.5 fine	1.00 ozt (31.10 g)	2017 – present
These images are to scale at 2.5 pixels per millimetre. For table standards, see the coin specification table.

=== Commemorative coins ===
Modern commemoratives have been minted since 1982. A list is available here.

Composition of US Modern Commemorative Coins
Type	Total Weight	Diameter	Composition	Face Value	Precious Metal Content
Half Dollar	11.34 g	30.61 mm (1.205 in)	Cu 92%, Ni 8%	50¢	none
Half Dollar	12.50 g	30.61 mm (1.205 in)	Ag 90%, Cu 10%	50¢	silver 10.25374 g (~0.36169 ozt)
Dollar	26.73 g	38.1 mm (1.500 in)	Ag 90%, Cu 10%	$1	silver 24.057 g (~0.773 ozt)
Dollar	26.73 g	38.1 mm (1.500 in)	Ag 99.9%	$1	silver
Half Eagle	8.539 g	21.59 mm (0.850 in)	Au 90%, Ag 6%, Cu 4%	$5	gold 7.523 g (~0.2418 ozt)
Rose Half Eagle	7.931 g	21.59 mm (0.850 in)	Au 85%, Cu 14.8%, Zn .2%	$5	gold 6.7414 g (0.21676 ozt)
Eagle	16.718 g	26.92 mm (1.060 in)	Au 90%, Ag 6%, Cu 4%	$10	gold 15.05 g (~0.484 ozt)
Bi-metallic Eagle	16.259 g	26.92 mm (1.060 in)	Au 48%, Pt 48%, alloy 4%	$10	gold, platinum
First Spouse Gold Bullion	14.175 g	26.49 mm (1.043 in)	Au 99.99%	$10	gold 14.175 g (~0.456 ozt)
Half Ounce Liberty Bell	15.552 g		Au 99.99%	$125	gold 15.552 g (0.5 ozt)
Semiquincentennial $250 coins	31.106 g	varies	Au 99.99%	$250	gold 31.106 g (1 ozt)

== Mint marks ==
List of current and past United States Mint branches and mint marks found on their coins:

Mint	Mint mark	Metal minted	Year established	Current status
Denver	D	All metals	1906	Facility open
Philadelphia	P or none (Note: The letter "P" is used for the Philadelphia mint mark on all coins (except cents) released from 1980 onward. Before this it had only been used on silver Jefferson nickels from 1942 to 1945.)	All metals	1792	Facility open
San Francisco	S	All metals	1854	Facility open (mainly produces proof)
West Point	W or none (Note: Between 1973 and 1986 there was no mint mark (these coins are indistinguishable from coins produced at the Philadelphia Mint from 1973 to 1980); after 1988 the letter "W" was used for coinage, except for the 2009 Ultra High Relief Double Eagle.)	Gold, Silver, Platinum and Palladium	1973	Facility open (mainly produces bullion)
Carson City	CC	Gold and Silver	1870	Facility closed, 1893 (Note: It is now the home of the Nevada State Museum, which still strikes commemorative medallions with the "CC" mint mark (most recently in 2014 commemorating the Nevada Sesquicentennial), using the former mint's original coin press.)
Charlotte	C	Gold only	1838	Facility closed, 1861
Dahlonega	D (Note: Although the mint mark "D" has been used by two separate mints, it is easy to distinguish between the two, as any 19th-century coinage is Dahlonega, and any 20th- or 21st-century coins are Denver.)	Gold only	1838	Facility closed, 1861
Manila (Note: During the period in which this mint branch was operational, The Philippines was an insular territory and then commonwealth of the U.S.; it was the first (and to date only) U.S. branch mint located outside the Continental United States.)	M or none (Note: The letter "M" was used for the Manila mint mark on all coins released from 1925 onward; before this, it had produced its coins with no mintmark.)	All metals	1920	Facility closed, 1922; re-opened 1925–1941
New Orleans	O	Gold and Silver	1838	Facility closed, 1861; re-opened 1879–1909 (Note: During the Civil War, this mint operated under the control of the State of Louisiana (February 1861) and the Confederate States of America (March 1861) until it ran out of bullion later in that year; some Half Dollars have been identified as being the issue of the State of Louisiana and the Confederacy.)

== Obsolete and canceled coins ==
- Half cent: 1/2¢, 1793–1857
- Silver center cent: 1¢, 1792 (not circulated)
- Large cent: 1¢, 1793–1857
- Ring cent: 1¢, 1850–1851, 1853, 1884–1885 (not circulated)
- Two-cent billon: 2¢, 1836 (not circulated)
- Two-cent bronze: 2¢, 1863–1873
- Three-cent bronze: 3¢, 1863 (not circulated)
- Three-cent nickel: 3¢, 1865–1889
- Trime (Three-cent silver): 3¢, 1851–1873
- Half dime: 5¢, 1792–1873
- Twenty-cent piece: 20¢, 1875–1878
- Silver dollar: $1.00, 1878–1904, 1921-28, 1934-1935
- Gold dollar: $1.00, 1849–1889 (some early commemoratives were minted in this denomination)
- Quarter eagle: $2.50, 1796–1929 (some early commemoratives were minted in this denomination)
- Three-dollar piece: $3.00, 1854–1889
- Stella: $4.00, 1879–1880 (not circulated)
- Half eagle: $5.00, 1795–1929 (some modern commemoratives are minted in this denomination)
- Eagle: $10.00, 1795–1933 (some modern commemoratives are minted in this denomination)
- Double eagle: $20.00, 1849–1933
- Half-union: $50.00, 1877 (not circulated, some early commemoratives were minted in this denomination)
- Union: $100.00 (planned but not minted, some modern commemoratives are minted in this denomination)

The law governing obsolete, mutilated, and worn coins and currency, including types which are no longer in production (e.g. Indian cents), can be found in 31 U.S.C. § 5120.

Note: It is a common misconception that "eagle"-based nomenclature for gold U.S. coinage was merely slang. The "eagle", "half-eagle" and "quarter-eagle" were specifically given these names in the Coinage Act of 1792. Likewise, the double eagle was specifically created as such by name ("An Act to authorize the Coinage of Gold Dollars and Double Eagles", title and section 1, March 3, 1849).

== Mill coins ==
Although the term mill (also mil or mille) was defined in the eighteenth century as 1/1,000 of a dollar or 0.1¢, no coin smaller than 0.5¢ has ever been officially minted in the U.S. However, unofficial mill coins, also called "tenth cent" or "tax-help coins", made of diverse materials—plastic, wood, tin, and others—were produced as late as the 1960s by some states, localities, and private businesses for tax payments and to render change for small purchases.

== Legal protections ==
The alteration or lightening of U.S. coins for fraudulent purposes is illegal. It is generally legal to melt down coins for the use of their constituent metals, but the Treasury Department has occasionally prohibited melting down and mass exportation when the value of the metal exceeds the face value of the coin. This has happened from 1967 to 1969 for silver coins, from 1974 to 1978 for pennies, and since 2006 for pennies and nickels. The use of elongated coin presses is considered legal because it is not for fraudulent purposes.

== See also ==
- California gold coinage
- Federal Reserve Note, for U.S. banknotes
- United States Mint coin sizes
- Penny debate in the United States
- United States commemorative coins
- United States coinage type set
