= Union (United States coin) =

Proposed US$100 coin

- United states
- Value: 100 US Dollars
- Composition: 90% Au; 10% Cu

Obverse
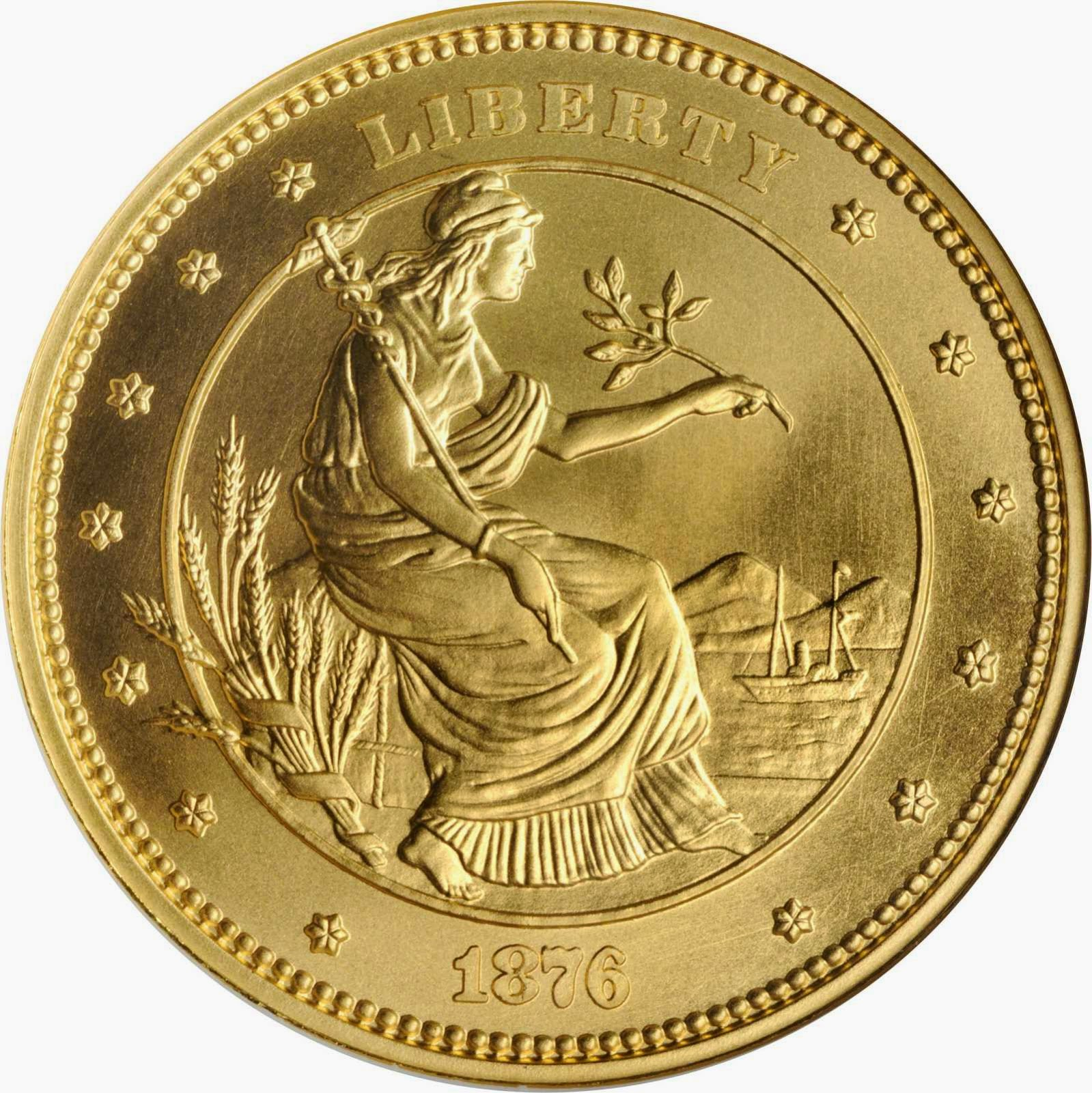
- Design: Liberty holding the caduceus and a branch (fantasy coin shown)
- Designer: George T. Morgan
- Design date: 1876

Reverse
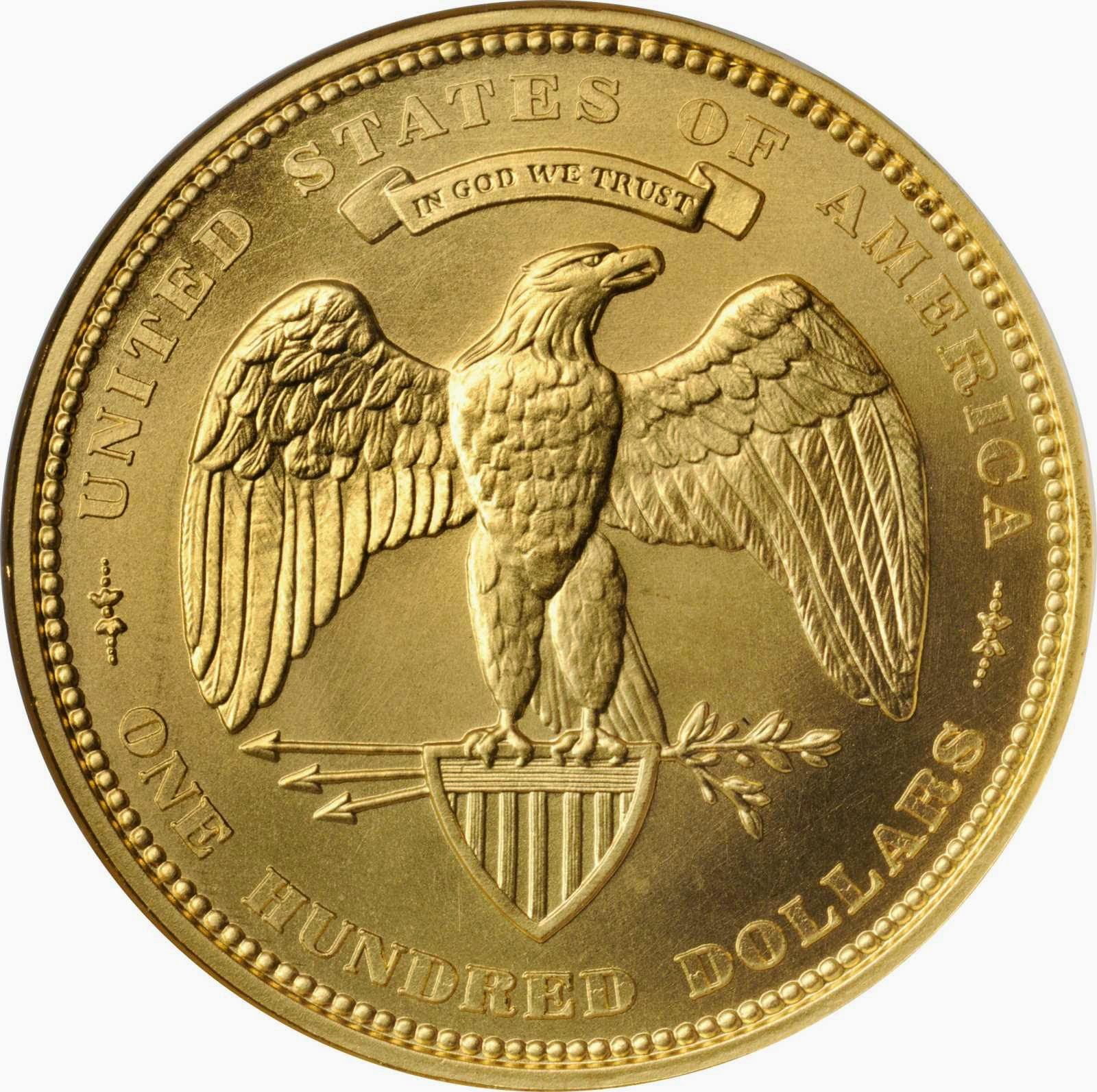
- Design: Eagle (fantasy coin shown)
- Designer: George T. Morgan
- Design date: 1876

The Union was a proposed $100 coin of the United States dollar. The US Mint canceled it before any pattern coins could be minted.

Since 1997 the Mint has released $100 denomination bullion coins, including the American Platinum Eagle coin, American Liberty high relief gold coin, and American Liberty 225th Anniversary gold coin.

== History ==
In 1854, San Francisco businessmen sent a petition to Secretary of the Treasury James Guthrie for a $50 coin to be struck because no banknotes of any denomination circulated in California. Guthrie responded to the petition by introducing a measure to produce gold $50 and $100 coins, called half union and union, respectively. Although the measure passed the Senate on June 16, 1854, it was ultimately defeated in the House.

United States Mint engraver George T. Morgan made sketches of a possible design for a $100 coin in 1876, should the half union ever be a success. When the mint concluded that the half union (a gold coin weighing about 2.7 troy ounces or 83.6 grams) was infeasible, the idea of a union coin was discarded and forgotten.

== Fantasy coins ==
Around 2005, Morgan's original sketches were discovered and published so the numismatic community could see what could have been. Private mints have since struck fantasy pieces of Morgan's design for collectors, in both silver and gold.

== Modern union coins ==
The $100 denomination has been produced by the US Mint since 1997 in the form of the American Platinum Eagle bullion coin. The bullion American Liberty union of 2015, 2019, and 2021 as well as the proof American Liberty 225th Anniversary union of 2017 were struck in 24 karat gold.
