= American Liberty 225th Anniversary gold coin =

United States coin

- United States
- Value: 100 U.S. dollars
- Mass: 31.11 g (1 oz)
- Diameter: 30.61 mm (1.205 in)
- Edge: Lettered
- Composition: 99.99% Au
- Years of minting: 2017
- Mint marks: W

Obverse
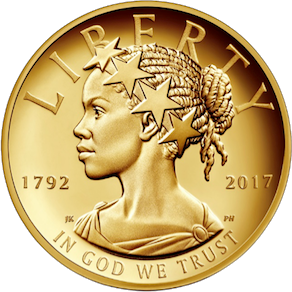
- Design: Liberty
- Designer: Justin Kunz

Reverse
- Design: Soaring American Bald Eagle
- Designer: Chris Costello

The American Liberty 225th Anniversary gold coin (or 2017 American Liberty gold coin) is a one-ounce gold coin minted to commemorate the 225th anniversary of the U.S. Mint. It was released on April 6, 2017. A companion series of one-ounce silver medals bearing the same designs was released on October 6 later that year.

The design of the coin, which was the first minted depiction of the Goddess of Liberty portrayed as an African-American woman, sparked a national conversation as a record-high number of viewers watched the U.S. Mint's live-streamed unveiling in January 2017. The 2017 coin was a result of the exploration of concepts for a new and modern Liberty and was directly inspired by the controversial 2015 African American Liberty designed by another AIP artist. The 2015 design had been recommended by the Commission of Fine Arts for the 2015 American Liberty high relief gold union, but was ultimately not chosen to be minted.

== Advocacy ==
In 2014, the U.S. Mint issued a proposal to strike an ultra high-relief gold coin and silver medal companion series. On July 22, 2014, the proposal was approved by the Citizens Coinage Advisory Committee (CCAC). The gold coins were approved without oversight from the U.S. Congress under the Mint's existing statutory legal authority, and the silver medals were granted through the authority of the Treasury Secretary.

The CCAC's recommendation for the 2017 coin became a subject of controversy as it was the first time that an African-American would be depicted as Lady Liberty on a U.S. Coin. Some coin collectors directed their criticism towards President Obama's administration, despite the fact that the coin and its design were decided solely between the US Mint and the CCAC. Nevertheless, the gold coin's design was unveiled in January 2017 and became available for purchase in July of the same year.

== Specifications ==
- Presentation Case: Black lacquered hardwood
- Edge: Lettered
- Weight: 31.108 grams
- Diameter: 30.61 mm
- Finish: Proof
- Composition: 99.99% Gold
- Content: .9999 fine

== Description ==
The design of the gold coin and its companion silver medal was chosen by the Citizens Coinage Advisory Committee from over 20 rival candidate designs, many of which were also intended to reflect the diversity by which American culture and values have evolved over time. The chosen design was strongly preferred by the committee, with members stating that it represented a "21st Century, modern representation of liberty" with emotional impact to contemporary Americans.

The obverse of the gold coin features Lady Liberty, portrayed as a youthful, African-American woman, wearing a crown of stars. It is also inscribed with the words "LIBERTY" behind Lady Liberty's hair, "1792", "2017", and "IN GOD WE TRUST". The obverse was designed by Mint Artistic Fusion Program (AIP) Designer Justin Kunz and engraved by Mint Sculptor-Engraver Phebe Hemphill.

The reverse of the coin features an American bald eagle flying left to right, and was designed by AIP Designer Chris Costello and engraved by Michael Gaudioso.

The coin was struck at the West Point Mint, and was the first high-relief coin with a proof finish minted in the United States.

== Silver medal ==
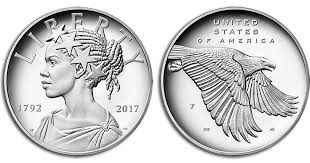
American Liberty 225th Anniversary silver medal

The US Mint released a series of .999 fine, 1 ounce silver medals as a companion to its 225th Anniversary Gold Coin. It was struck at the Philadelphia Mint and released on October 19.

=== Silver medal specifications ===
- Edge: Plain
- Weight: 31.103 grams
- Diameter: 40.60 mm
- Composition: 99.99% Silver
- Content: .9999 fine
- Mint Mark: P

== Reception and sales ==
The usage of an African-American woman on the design sparked a minor controversy within the numismatic community. There was a mintage limit of 100,000 for the gold coins. 14,285 pieces, or 14.3% of the total possible, were sold on the first day that the coin became available on the US Mint catalog. In August 2022, the U.S. Mint ran a limited time special, offering a free 2018-W $10 American Liberty 1/10 Ounce Gold Coin with every purchase of the American Liberty One Ounce 225th Anniversary Gold Coin, in an attempt to clear remaining inventory. Cumulative sales figures released by the US Mint December 4, 2022 indicate 38,020 pieces have been sold, with only a total 39,061 having been sold by December 31, 2023. As of January 5, 2024, the coin is still available for sale by the Mint, despite the 2015, 2019, 2021 and 2023 American Liberty High Relief designs having sold out.

The silver medals had first day sales of 26,833 pieces, outperforming its gold counterpart.
