= American Liberty high relief gold coin =

Series of United States special-issue bullion coins

- United States
- Value: 100 US dollars
- Mass: 31.10 g (1 troy oz)
- Diameter: 30.61 mm (1.205 in)
- Edge: Reeded (standard); Lettered (2017 only)
- Composition: 99.99% Au
- Years of minting: 2015–present (every other year)
- Mint marks: W

Obverse
- Design: Various depictions of Liberty (2019 design shown)
- Designer: Various
- Design date: 2015–present

Reverse
- Design: Various depictions of eagles
- Designer: Various
- Design date: 2015–present

The American Liberty high relief gold coin is a one-ounce gold bullion coin issued by the United States Mint since 2015. This coin was the first 100 dollar gold coin to be issued by the US Mint.

== Description ==
The first American Liberty coin was issued in 2015, and new coins have been released every other year since. The coins are struck at the West Point Mint on a 1 oz. 24 karat gold planchet.

== Design ==
Designs for the American Liberty coins are submitted to the US Mint via the Artistic Infusion Program. The United States Commission of Fine Arts reviews the proposed designs and makes recommendations, which the Mint may or may not use.

Year	Description			Production	
Year	Obverse Design	Reverse Design	Edge	Authorized Maximum	Mintage
2015	Standing Liberty holding a torch and an American flag	Flying eagle with olive branches in its talons	Reeded	50,000	49,325
2017	Black liberty wearing a crown of stars	Eagle in flight	Lettered	100,000	49,698
2019	Liberty with 13 rays emanating from her headdress	Eagle preparing to land	Reeded	50,000	TBD
2021	Mustang horse, bucking off a saddle	Close-up view of an eagle's head	Reeded	12,500	12,471
2023	Bristlecone pine	Eagle standing on rocky outcropping	Reeded	12,500	12,188
2025	Sunflower with a bee	Swirling Eagle	Reeded	12,000	TBD

In addition to the above-listed releases, a one tenth ounce version of the 2017 coin was released in 2018

== Silver Medals ==
One ounce silver medals were produced in the same design as the gold coins. The medals lack certain inscriptions as well as a denomination, but bear the same motifs of Liberty on the obverse and an eagle on the reverse.

Year	Description			Production	
Year	Weight	Edge	Finish	Mint	Authorized Maximum
2016	1 oz	Flat	Proof	S	12,500
2016	1 oz	Flat	Proof	W	12,500
2017	1 oz	Flat	Proof	P	
2017	1 oz	Flat	Proof	S	
2017	1 oz	Flat	Reverse Proof	P	
2017	1 oz	Flat	Uncirculated	D	
2017	1 oz	Flat	Enhanced Uncirculated	W	
2019	2.5 oz	Flat	Uncirculated (high relief)	P	
2022	1 oz	Flat	Proof	P	75,000
2023	1 oz	Flat	Proof	P	
2025	1 oz	Flat	Proof	P	60,000
