= Half union =

Gold coin issued by the United States

- United states
- Value: 50 US Dollars
- Mass: 83.58 g
- Diameter: 50.80 mm
- Edge: Reeded
- Composition: 90% Au; 10% Cu
- Years of minting: 1877
- Mint marks: None (half union patterns were minted at the Philadelphia Mint)

Obverse
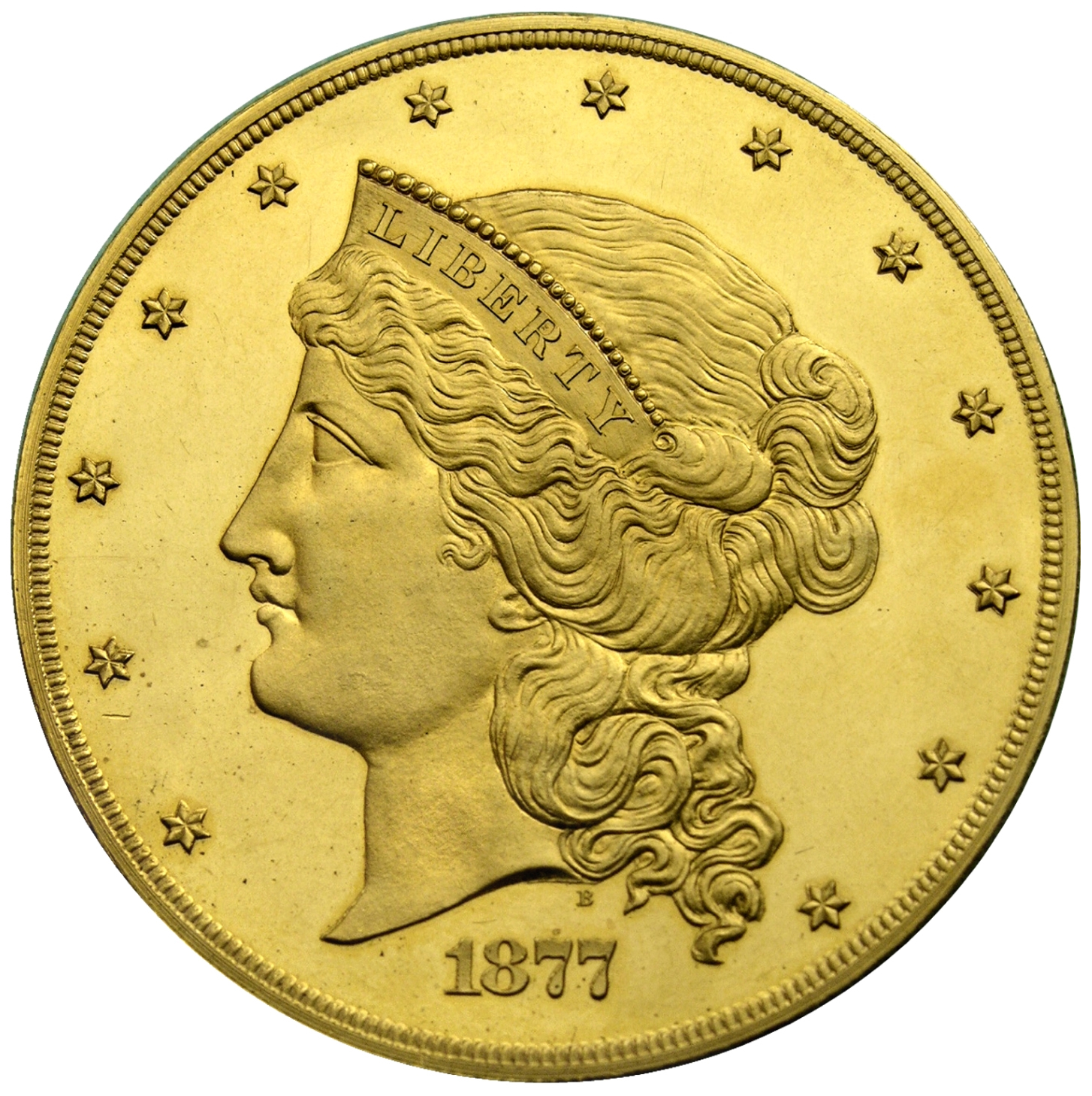
- Design: Liberty
- Designer: William Barber
- Design date: 1877

Reverse
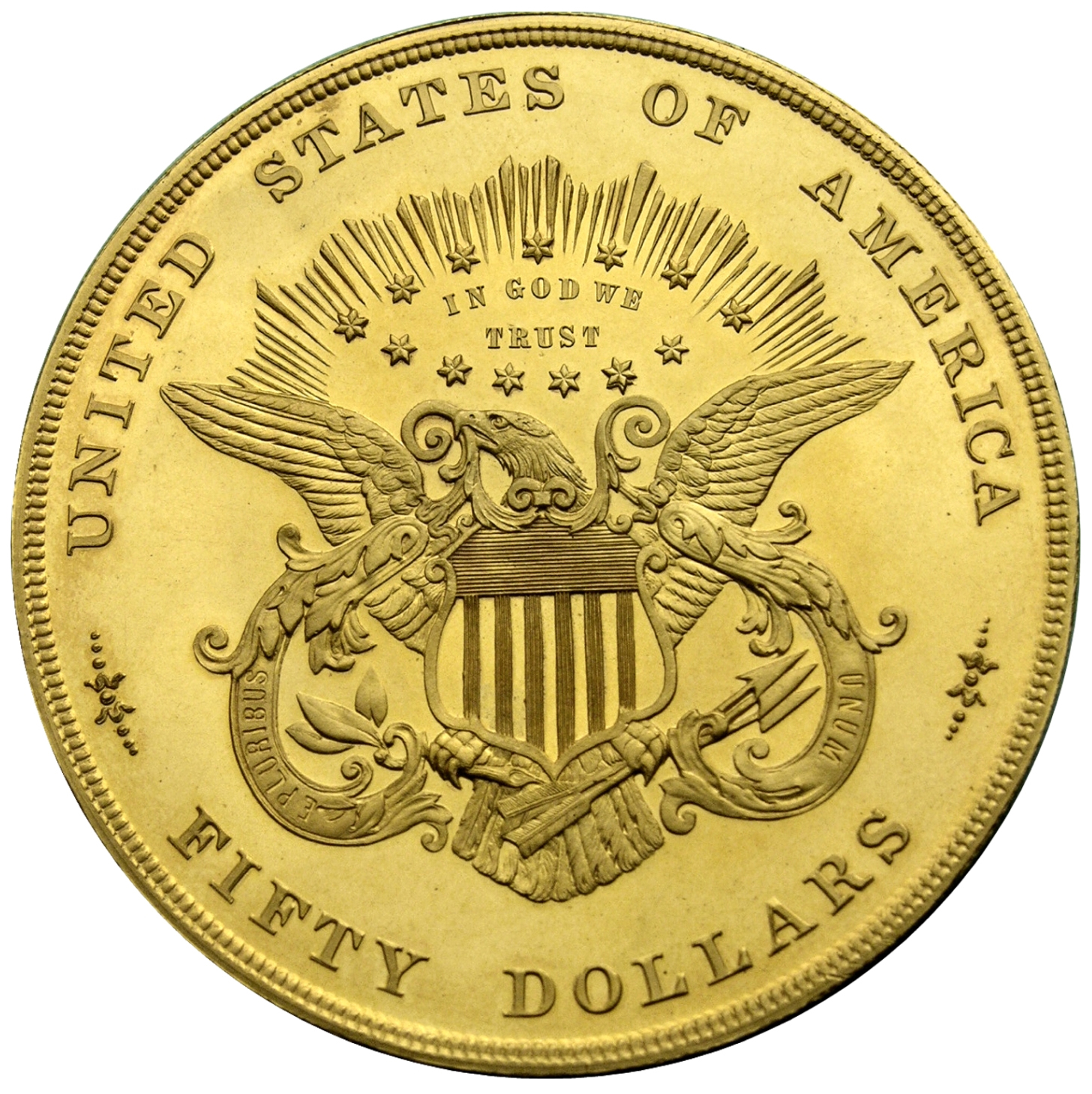
- Design: Eagle
- Designer: William Barber
- Design date: 1877

The half union (separate varieties known as J-1546 through J-1549) was a United States pattern coin with a face value of fifty U.S. Dollars. It is often thought of as one of the most significant and well-known patterns in the history of the U.S. Mint. The basic design, featuring Liberty on the obverse, was slightly modified from the similar $20 "Liberty Head" Double Eagle, which was designed by James B. Longacre and minted from 1849 to 1907.

Today, two gold specimens belong to the Smithsonian. No others are known to exist. There are also copper specimens of the coin that can go for more than $300,000 in PF-65 condition. The half union was never released for circulation.

Some half unions can have a somewhat smaller or larger head than others.

== History ==
In 1877, famed Chief Engraver of the Mint at the time, William Barber, designed the coin. William Barber also designed several other coins, such as the "Amazonian Quarter" pattern, the short-lived Twenty Cent Piece, and the Trade Dollar. The coin was designed to weigh roughly 2.5 ounces and be made of solid gold. Had it been made for circulation with the general public, the coin would have been the highest valued gold coin ever made at the time, with a face value of fifty dollars. As it is a pattern, it was never struck for circulation and all other known presentation versions were made of copper or sometimes various gilded metals. Only two examples were actually struck in gold, and today both reside in the Smithsonian.

== Commemorative coin ==
In 1915, a gold commemorative coin was issued in $50 denomination, the Panama–Pacific half union. It was minted in round and octagonal varieties, the latter being the only United States coin issued to date that is not round.
