= United States Mint coin sizes =

The United States Mint has minted over 20 different kinds of coins, of many different sizes. Often, it is difficult for people to get a grasp of what much of the historical coinage looked like, at least in relation to modern circulating coins. This chart shows all of the coin types, and their diameters, grouped by coins of similar size and by general composition.

Seven distinct types of coin composition have been used over the past 200 years: three base coin alloys, two silver alloys, gold, and in recent years, platinum and palladium. The base metal coins were generally alloys of copper (for 2 cent coins and lower), and copper/nickel (for 3 and 5 cent coins). Copper/nickel composition is also used for all modern "silver" coins.

US Coin Sizes and Composition
Steel Alloy	Copper		Copper Alloy		Silver Alloy	Silver	Gold		Platinum	Palladium
						Three Cent; 14 mm 0.8 g 0.750 fine 1851–1853; 14 mm 0.75 g 0.900 fine 1854–1873				
						Half Dime; 15.5 mm 1.24 g 1794–1873	Dollar; 15 mm 1.67 gr 1849–1889	$5 American Gold Eagle; 16.5 mm 3.11 g 1986–present	$10 American Platinum Eagle; 16.5 mm 3.11 g 1997–present	
			Three Cent; 17.9 mm 1.94 g 1865-1889	Dime (Clad); 17.91 mm 2.268 g 1965–present		Dime; 17.9 mm 2.5 g 1796–1964	$2.50 Gold Quarter Eagle; 18 mm 4.2 g 1796–1929			
Small Cent; 19.05 mm 2.5 g 1943	Small Cent; 19.05 mm 3.11 g 1864-1982		Small Cent; 19.05 mm 4.67 g 1856-1864; 2.5 g 1982–2025				Three Dollar; 20.5 mm 5.01 g 1853–1876			
			Nickel; 21.21 mm 5 g 1866–present		Nickel; 21.21 mm 5 g 1942–1945	Twenty Cent; 22 mm 5 g 1875–1878	$5 Half Eagle; 21.6 mm 8.36 g 1795–1929	$10 American Gold Eagle; 22 mm 7.78 g 1986–present	$25 American Platinum Eagle; 22 mm 7.78 g 1997–present	
	Half Cent; 23.5 mm 6.74 g 1795–1857	Two Cent; 23 mm 6.22 g 1864-1873	Quarter (Clad); 24.26 mm 5.67 g 1965–present		Quarter (40% Ag); 24.3 mm 5.75 g 1976(S)	Quarter; 24.3 mm 6.25 g 1796–1964				
			Dollar; 26.49 mm 8.1 g 1979–Present				$10 Eagle; 27 mm 17.5 g 1795–1933	$25 American Gold Eagle; 27 mm 17.5 g 1986–present	$50 American Platinum Eagle; 27 mm 15.6 g 1997–present	
	Large Cent; 28 mm 10.89 g 1793–1857		Half Dollar (Clad); 30.61 mm 11.34 g 1971–present		Half Dollar (40% Ag); 30.6 mm 11.5 g 1965–1970, 1976(S)	Half Dollar; 30.6 mm 12.5 g 1796–1964				
							$50 American Gold Eagle; 32.7 mm 31.1 g 1986–present		$100 American Platinum Eagle; 32.7 mm 31.1 g 1997–present	
							$20 Double Eagle; 34 mm 35 g 1849–1933			$25 American Palladium Eagle; 34.036 mm 31.120 g 2017–present
			Dollar (Clad); 38.1 mm 22.68 g 1971–1978		Dollar (40% Ag); 38.1 mm 24.59 g 1971(S)-1976(S)	Dollar; 38.1 mm 26.73 g 1794–1935				
						$1 American Silver Eagle; 40.6 mm 31.1 g 1986–present				

Representative images of US coin sizes
Steel Alloy	Copper		Copper Alloy		Silver Alloy	Silver	Gold		Platinum	Palladium
						3-Cent Silver				
						Silver Half Dime		$5 Gold Bullion	$10 Platinum Bullion	
			Cupronickel 3 Cents	Clad Dime		Mercury Dime	Quarter Eagle			
Zinc Coated Steel Wartime Cent	95% Copper Bronze Cent		88% Copper "White Cent" 2.5% Copper Small Cent				Three Dollar Piece			
					35% Silver War Nickel	Silver 20-cent Coin	Half Eagle	$10 Gold Bullion	$25 Platinum Bullion	
	Copper Half Cent	Copper Two Cent	Clad Washington Quarter			Silver Standing Liberty Quarter				
			Clad Anthony Dollar "Golden" Dollar				Eagle	$25 Gold Bullion	$50 Platinum Bullion	
			Clad Half Dollar		40% Silver Half Dollar	Silver Half Dollar				
							$50 Gold Bullion		$100 Platinum Bullion	
			Clad Eisenhower Dollar		40% Silver Eisenhower Dollar	Silver Peace Dollar	Double Eagle			
						$1 Silver Bullion				

Notes on the tables:

- Images are close to actual size on a 92-dpi monitor.
- Clad Half Dollars, Silver Half Dollars and Dollars, and Gold Half Eagles and Eagles are still regularly minted as commemorative coins. Dimes, quarters and half dollars are also struck in 90% silver for special annual collector's sets.
- The silver-colored Susan B. Anthony dollar was replaced with gold-colored Sacagawea dollar in 2000 and Presidential Dollars 2007-2016; though the composition changed, the coin's size and weight remain the same.
- Some variances in coin size and weight occurred over time, especially as the value of silver varied. In particular, many silver coins changed in the 1870s. The figures cited in the tables are representative of the series, and are generally the latest, or most common, figures for a given coin type.

The largest coin ever minted by the US Mint was the 2019 Apollo 50th anniversary 5ounce silver dollar, weighing 155.517 grams, and 76.2 mm in diameter.
