= United States Mint Set =

Collectable coin set from the United States Mint

The United States Uncirculated Coin Set, known as the Uncirculated Set or Mint Set in the United States, is an annual coin set sold by the United States Mint. The set is marketed towards coin collectors as a way to obtain circulation coins in mint condition.

== "Double" Mint Sets (1947–1958) ==
The Uncirculated Mint Set was introduced in 1947, containing two examples of each coin issued for circulation packaged in a cardboard display case. The reason for this was so that collectors could display both the obverse and reverse of each coin in the set's packaging, which allowed only one side of the coin to be displayed.

Because of the sulfur content in the cardboard packaging, many coins included in the sets developed toning.

List of Mint Sets 1947–1958
Year	1¢	5¢	10¢	25¢	50¢	Total face value	Mintage
1947	Lincoln Wheat Cent 2x (P),D,S	Jefferson Nickel 2x (P),D,S	Roosevelt Dime 2x (P),D,S	Washington Quarter 2x (P),D,S	Walking Liberty Half Dollar 2x (P),D	$4.46	≈5,000
1948	2x (P),D,S	2x (P),D,S	2x (P),D,S	2x (P),D,S	Franklin Half Dollar 2x (P),D	$4.46	≈6,000
1949	2x (P),D,S	2x (P),D,S	2x (P),D,S	2x (P),D	2x (P),D,S	$4.96	≈5,000
1951	2x (P),D,S	2x (P),D,S	2x (P),D,S	2x (P),D,S	2x (P),D,S	$5.46	8,654
1952	2x (P),D,S	2x (P),D,S	2x (P),D,S	2x (P),D,S	2x (P),D,S	$5.46	11,499
1953	2x (P),D,S	2x (P),D,S	2x (P),D,S	2x (P),D,S	2x (P),D,S	$5.46	15,538
1954	2x (P),D,S	2x (P),D,S	2x (P),D,S	2x (P),D,S	2x (P),D,S	$5.46	25,599
1955	2x (P),D,S	2x (P),D	2x (P),D,S	2x (P),D	2x (P)	$2.86	49,656
1956	2x (P),D	2x (P),D	2x (P),D	2x (P),D	2x (P)	$2.64	45,475
1957	2x (P),D	2x (P),D	2x (P),D	2x (P),D	2x (P),D	$3.64	34,324
1958	2x (P),D	2x (P),D	2x (P),D	2x (P),D	2x (P),D	$3.64	50,314

== 1959–1964 Mint Sets ==
In 1959, the packaging of the Mint Set was changed to cellophane pouches. This change allowed both sides of the coins to be displayed, and eliminated the need to include two examples of each coin. This led to a significant drop in price and an increase in popularity.

List of Mint Sets 1959–1964
Year	1¢	5¢	10¢	25¢	50¢	Total face value	Mintage
1959	Lincoln Memorial Cent (P),D	Jefferson Nickel (P),D	Roosevelt Dime (P),D	Washington Quarter (P),D	Franklin Half Dollar (P),D	$1.82	187,000
1960	(P),D	(P),D	(P),D	(P),D	(P),D	$1.82	260,485
1961	(P),D	(P),D	(P),D	(P),D	(P),D	$1.82	223,704
1962	(P),D	(P),D	(P),D	(P),D	(P),D	$1.82	385,285
1963	(P),D	(P),D	(P),D	(P),D	(P),D	$1.82	606,612
1964	(P),D	(P),D	(P),D	(P),D	Kennedy Half Dollar (P),D	$1.82	1,008,108

== Special Mint Sets (1965–1967) ==
Due to a shortage of coins blamed on coin collectors, the United States Department of the Treasury introduced the Coinage Act of 1965, which mandated that mint marks would be removed from all coinage for five years. The USDT also announced that no proof or uncirculated coin sets would be produced from 1965 through 1967. Instead, a "Special Mint Set" was made available, containing one example of each denomination produced at the San Francisco Mint. These coins were struck with a satin-like finish, and unlike the coins found in standard Mint Sets, are considered to be separate issues from the circulation coins.

Due to the fact that no proof sets were produced from 1965 to 1967, many proof set collectors obtain Special Mint Sets to complete their collections of "yearly proof set" collections.

Several dozen 1964 Special Mint Sets were produced for unknown reasons. The existence of these sets remained largely unknown until the 1990s, when one of the sets was sold at an auction. The coins featured the same satin finish as the other Special Mint Sets.

List of Special Mint Sets 1964–1967
Year	1¢	5¢	10¢	25¢	50¢	Other	Total face value	Mintage
1964	Lincoln Memorial Cent (S)	Jefferson Nickel (S)	Roosevelt Dime (S)	Washington Quarter (S)	Kennedy Half Dollar (S)	–	$0.91	≈20-50
1965	(S)	(S)	(S)	(S)	(S)	U.S. Mint token	$0.91	2,360,000
1966	(S)	(S)	(S)	(S)	(S)	–	$0.91	2,261,583
1967	(S)	(S)	(S)	(S)	(S)	–	$0.91	1,863,344

== 1968–2004 Mint Sets ==
1968 saw the return of mintmarks on United States coinage and the standard Mint Set. Apart from minor changes to the packaging, the new mint sets were nearly identical to the previous Mint Sets. The dollar coin made its Mint Set debut in 1973, and was notably not issued for circulation that year.

No Mint Sets were produced in 1982 and 1983, and when the set returned in 1984, no dollar coin was included (the denomination had been discontinued in 1981) and US Mint tokens from the Philadelphia and Denver Mints were included in its place. These tokens were removed from the set when the denomination was reintroduced in 2000.

A dime featuring the W mint mark (West Point Mint) was included in the 1996 Mint Set to commemorate the 50th anniversary of the Roosevelt dime. The coin was not issued for circulation.

List of Mint Sets 1968–2004
Year	1¢	5¢	10¢	25¢	50¢	$1	Other	Total face value	Mintage	Missing from the set
1968	Lincoln Memorial Cent (P),D,S	Jefferson Nickel D,S	Roosevelt Dime (P),D	Washington Quarter (P),D	Kennedy Half Dollar D	–	–	$1.33	2,105,128	–
1969	(P),D,S	D,S	(P),D	(P),D	D	–	–	$1.33	1,817,392	–
1970	(P),D,S	D,S	(P),D	(P),D	D	–	–	$1.33	2,038,134	–
1971	(P),D,S	(P),D	(P),D	(P),D	(P),D	–	–	$1.83	2,193,396	Eisenhower Dollar (P),D
1972	(P),D,S	(P),D	(P),D	(P),D	(P),D	–	–	$1.83	2,750,000	(P),D
1973	(P),D,S	(P),D	(P),D	(P),D	(P),D	Eisenhower Dollar (P),D	–	$3.83	1,767,691	–
1974	(P),D,S	(P),D	(P),D	(P),D	(P),D	(P),D	–	$3.83	1,975,981	–
1975	(P),D	(P),D	(P),D	(P),D	(P),D	(P),D	–	$3.82	1,921,488	–
1976	(P),D	(P),D	(P),D	(P),D	(P),D	(P),D	–	$3.82	1,892,513	–
1977	(P),D	(P),D	(P),D	(P),D	(P),D	(P),D	–	$3.82	2,006,869	–
1978	(P),D	(P),D	(P),D	(P),D	(P),D	(P),D	–	$3.82	2,162,609	–
1979	(P),D	(P),D	(P),D	(P),D	(P),D	Susan B. Anthony Dollar P,D	–	$3.82	2,526,000	Susan B. Anthony dollar S
1980	(P),D	P,D	P,D	P,D	P,D	P,D,S	–	$4.82	2,815,066	–
1981	(P),D	P,D	P,D	P,D	P,D	P,D,S	–	$4.82	2,908,145	–
1984	(P),D	P,D	P,D	P,D	P,D	–	US Mint tokens P,D	$1.82	1,832,857	–
1985	(P),D	P,D	P,D	P,D	P,D	–	P,D	$1.82	1,710,571	–
1986	(P),D	P,D	P,D	P,D	P,D	–	P,D	$1.82	1,153,536	–
1987	(P),D	P,D	P,D	P,D	P,D	–	P,D	$1.82	2,890,758	–
1988	(P),D	P,D	P,D	P,D	P,D	–	P,D	$1.82	1,646,204	–
1989	(P),D	P,D	P,D	P,D	P,D	–	P,D	$1.82	1,987,915	–
1990	(P),D	P,D	P,D	P,D	P,D	–	P,D	$1.82	1,809,184	–
1991	(P),D	P,D	P,D	P,D	P,D	–	P,D	$1.82	1,352,101	–
1992	(P),D	P,D	P,D	P,D	P,D	–	P,D	$1.82	1,500,143	–
1993	(P),D	P,D	P,D	P,D	P,D	–	P,D	$1.82	1,297,431	–
1994	(P),D	P,D	P,D	P,D	P,D	–	P,D	$1.82	1,234,813	–
1995	(P),D	P,D	P,D	P,D	P,D	–	P,D	$1.82	1,038,787	–
1996	(P),D	P,D	P,D,W	P,D	P,D	–	P,D	$1.92	1,457,949	–
1997	(P),D	P,D	P,D	P,D	P,D	–	P,D	$1.82	950,473	–
1998	(P),D	P,D	P,D	P,D	P,D	–	P,D	$1.82	1,187,325	–
1999	(P),D	P,D	P,D	50 State Quarters Program: Delaware P,D Pennsylvania P,D New Jersey P,D Georgia P,D Connecticut P,D	P,D	–	P,D	$3.82	1,243,867	Susan B. Anthony dollar P,D
2000	(P),D	P,D	P,D	Massachusetts P,D Maryland P,D South Carolina P,D New Hampshire P,D Virginia P,D	P,D	Sacagawea Golden Dollar P,D	–	$5.82	1,490,160	–
2001	(P),D	P,D	P,D	New York P,D North Carolina P,D Rhode Island P,D Vermont P,D Kentucky P,D	P,D	P,D	–	$5.82	1,116,915	–
2002	(P),D	P,D	P,D	Tennessee P,D Ohio P,D Louisiana P,D Indiana P,D Mississippi P,D	P,D	P,D	–	$5.82	1,139,388	–
2003	(P),D	P,D	P,D	Illinois P,D Alabama P,D Maine P,D Missouri P,D Arkansas P,D	P,D	P,D	–	$5.82	1,001,532	–
2004	(P),D	Westward Journey Nickel Series: Peace Medal P,D; Keelboat P,D	P,D	Michigan P,D Florida P,D Texas P,D Iowa P,D Wisconsin P,D	P,D	P,D	–	$5.92	842,507	–
Bold mintmarks indicate coins that were not issued for circulation

== Satin-finish Mint Sets (2005–2010) ==
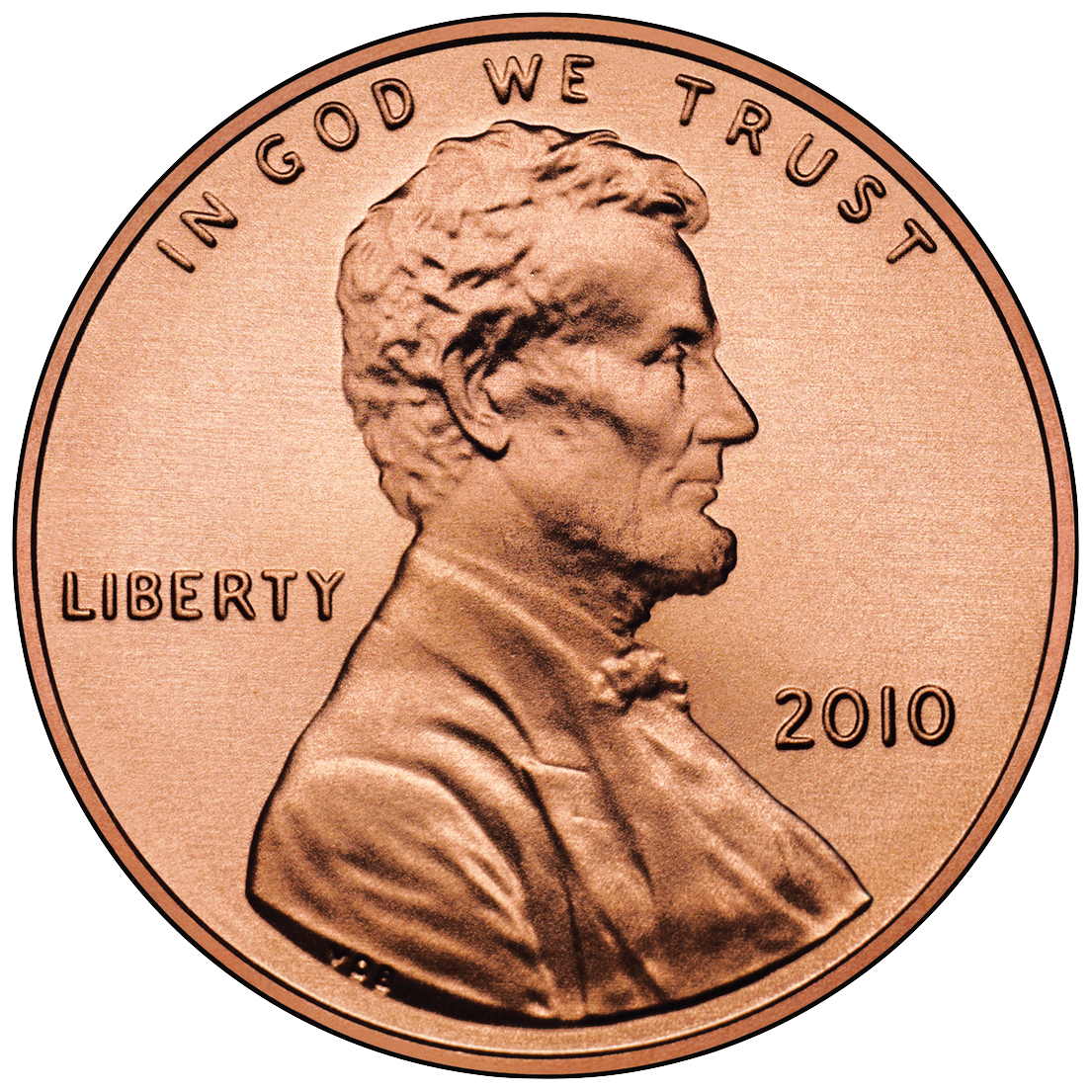
A penny from the 2010 Mint Set

In 2005, the US Mint started to produce Mint Set coins using special sandblasted dies, giving the coins a distinctive satin finish similar to the Special Mint Set coins. Like the Special Mint Set coins, many numismatists consider these to be separate issues from the circulation coins.

With a total of 36 coins and a total face value of $14.38, the 2009 Mint Set had the most coins and highest face value of any Mint Set to date.

List of Mint Sets 2005–2010
Year	1¢	5¢	10¢	25¢	50¢	$1	Total face value	Mintage
2005	Lincoln Memorial Cent (P),D	Westward Journey Nickel Series: American Bison P,D Ocean in View P,D	Roosevelt Dime P,D	50 State Quarters Program: California P,D Minnesota P,D Oregon P,D Kansas P,D West Virginia P,D	Kennedy Half Dollar P,D	Sacagawea Golden Dollar P,D	$5.92	1,160,000
2006	(P),D	[[:|Return to Monticello]] P,D	P,D	Nevada P,D Nebraska P,D Colorado P,D North Dakota P,D South Dakota P,D	P,D	P,D	$5.82	847,361
2007	(P),D	P,D	P,D	Montana P,D Washington P,D Idaho P,D Wyoming P,D Utah P,D	P,D	Sacagawea P,D Presidential $1 Coin Program: George Washington P,D John Adams P,D Thomas Jefferson P,D James Madison P,D	$13.82	895,628
2008	(P),D	P,D	P,D	Oklahoma P,D New Mexico P,D Arizona P,D Alaska P,D Hawaii P,D	P,D	Sacagawea P,D James Monroe P,D John Quincy Adams P,D Andrew Jackson P,D Martin Van Buren P,D	$13.82	745,464
2009	Lincoln Bicentennial One Cent Program: Birthplace P,D; Formative Years P,D; Professional Life P,D; Presidency P,D	P,D	P,D	DC and U.S. Territories Quarters: District of Columbia P,D Puerto Rico P,D Guam P,D American Samoa P,D US Virgin Islands P,D Northern Mariana Islands P,D	P,D	Native American $1 Coin Program: Sacagawea Agriculture P,D William Henry Harrison P,D John Tyler P,D James K. Polk P,D Zachary Taylor P,D	$14.38	784,614
2010	Lincoln Shield Cent: (P),D	P,D	P,D	America the Beautiful Quarters Program: Hot Springs National Park P,D Yellowstone National Park P,D Yosemite National Park P,D Grand Canyon National Park P,D Mount Hood National Forest P,D	P,D	Sacagawea Great Law Of Peace P,D P,D Millard Fillmore P,D Franklin Pierce P,D James Buchanan P,D Abraham Lincoln P,D	$13.82	583,912
Bold mintmarks indicate coins that were not issued for circulation

== Brilliant-Finish Mint Sets (2011–present) ==
In 2011, the US Mint changed the finish of Mint Set coins to a more proof-like "brilliant" finish. This change was made because the satin finish of the 2005–2010 coins made contact marks more apparent. The brilliant finish coins are struck with more force than circulation coins, resulting in higher quality and more detailed design. However, like the pre-2005 Mint Sets, these coins are not considered different issues.

A penny with the W mint mark was included in the 2019 Mint Set to commemorate the 110th anniversary of the Lincoln cent. Similarly, a W mint mark nickel was planned to be included in the 2020 Mint Set; however due to the COVID pandemic, the coin was not produced.

List of Mint Sets 2011–present
Year	1¢	5¢	10¢	25¢	50¢	$1	Total face value	Mintage
2011	Lincoln Shield Cent (P),D	Jefferson Nickel P,D	Roosevelt Dime P,D	America the Beautiful Quarters Program: Gettysburg National Park P,D Glacier National Park P,D Olympic National Park P,D Vicksburg National Park P,D Chickasaw Recreation Area P,D	Kennedy Half Dollar P,D	Native American $1 Coin Program: Sacagawea Wampanoag Treaty P,D Presidential $1 Coin Program: Andrew Johnson P,D Ulysses S. Grant P,D Rutherford B. Hayes P,D James A. Garfield P,D	$13.82	533,529
2012	(P),D	P,D	P,D	El Yunque National Forest P,D Chaco Culture National Historical Park P,D Acadia National Park P,D Hawaii Volcanoes National Park P,D Denali National Park P,D	P,D	Sacagawea Trade Routes P,D Chester Arthur P,D Grover Cleveland (1st term) P,D Benjamin Harrison P,D Grover Cleveland (2nd term) P,D	$13.82	392,224
2013	(P),D	P,D	P,D	White Mountain National Forest P,D Perry's Victory International Peace Memorial P,D Great Basin National Park P,D Fort McHenry National Monument P,D Mount Rushmore National Memorial P,D	P,D	Sacagawea Delaware Treaty P,D William McKinley P,D Theodore Roosevelt P,D William Howard Taft P,D Woodrow Wilson P,D	$13.82	376,844
2014	(P),D	P,D	P,D	Great Smoky Mountains National Park P,D Shenandoah National Park P,D Arches National Park P,D Great Sand Dunes National Park P,D Everglades National Park P,D	P,D	Sacagawea Native Hospitality P,D Warren G. Harding P,D Calvin Coolidge P,D Herbert Hoover P,D Franklin D. Roosevelt P,D	$13.82	345,813
2015	(P),D	P,D	P,D	Homestead National Monument of America P,D Kisatchie National Forest P,D Blue Ridge Parkway P,D Bombay Hook National Wildlife Refuge P,D Saratoga National Historical Park P,D	P,D	Sacagawea Mohawk Ironworker P,D Harry S. Truman P,D Dwight D. Eisenhower P,D John F. Kennedy P,D Lyndon B. Johnson P,D	$13.82	314,032
2016	(P),D	P,D	P,D	Shawnee National Forest P,D Cumberland Gap National Historical Park P,D Harpers Ferry National Historical Park P,D Theodore Roosevelt National Park P,D Fort Moultrie P,D	P,D	Sacagawea Code Talkers P,D Richard M. Nixon P,D Gerald R. Ford P,D Ronald Reagan P,D	$11.82	296,582
2017	P,D	P,D	P,D	Effigy Mounds National Monument P,D Frederick Douglass National Historic Site P,D Ozark National Scenic Riverways P,D Ellis Island P,D George Rogers Clark National Historical Park P,D	P,D	Sacagawea Sequoyah P,D	$5.82	286,813
2018	(P),D	P,D	P,D	Pictured Rocks National Lakeshore P,D Apostle Islands National Lakeshore P,D Voyageurs National Park P,D Cumberland Island National Seashore P,D Block Island National Wildlife Refuge P,D	P,D	Sacagawea Jim Thorpe P,D	$5.82	257,531
2019	(P),D,W	P,D	P,D	Lowell National Historical Park P,D American Memorial Park P,D War in the Pacific National Historical Park P,D San Antonio Missions National Historical Park P,D Frank Church River of No Return Wilderness P,D	P,D	Sacagawea Mary Golda Ross P,D	$5.83	346,117
2020	(P),D	P,D,(W Never Minted)	P,D	National Park P,D Weir Farm P,D Salt River Bay P,D Marsh-Billings-Rockefeller P,D Tallgrass Prairie P,D	P,D	P,D	$5.87	211,787
2021	(P),D	P,D,	P,D	Tuskegee Airmen National Historic Site P,D Crossing the Delaware P,D	P,D	P,D	$4.32	TBD
Bold mintmarks indicate coins that were not issued for circulation

== Bicentennial Silver Mint Set (1976) ==
In 1976, the US Mint issued a mint set containing a quarter, half dollar, and dollar coin minted in silver. These coins featured special reverse designs commemorating the bicentennial of American independence.

Year	25¢	50¢	$1	Total face value	Mintage
1976	Washington quarter S	Kennedy half dollar S	Eisenhower dollar S	$1.75	4,908,319

== Souvenir Sets ==
=== Standard set ===
Starting in 1972, the Denver Mint started selling Souvenir Sets, and the Philadelphia Mint did the same in 1973. These sets, available in each mints' gift shop following a public tour, contained one example of that mints' penny, nickel, dime, quarter, and half dollar, along with a medal featuring an image of its mint. These sets were sold until they were discontinued with the launch of the 50 State Quarter Program in 1999. Production figures were not recorded by the mint, and the sets receive relatively little attention from coin collectors. The 1982 and 1983 sets are an exception, though, as no Mint Sets were sold for those years, so these were collected instead.

=== Susan B. Anthony dollar sets ===
Souvenir Sets containing Susan B. Anthony dollars from the Philadelphia, Denver, and San Francisco Mints were offered from 1979 through 1981.
