= Selma Burke =

American sculptor

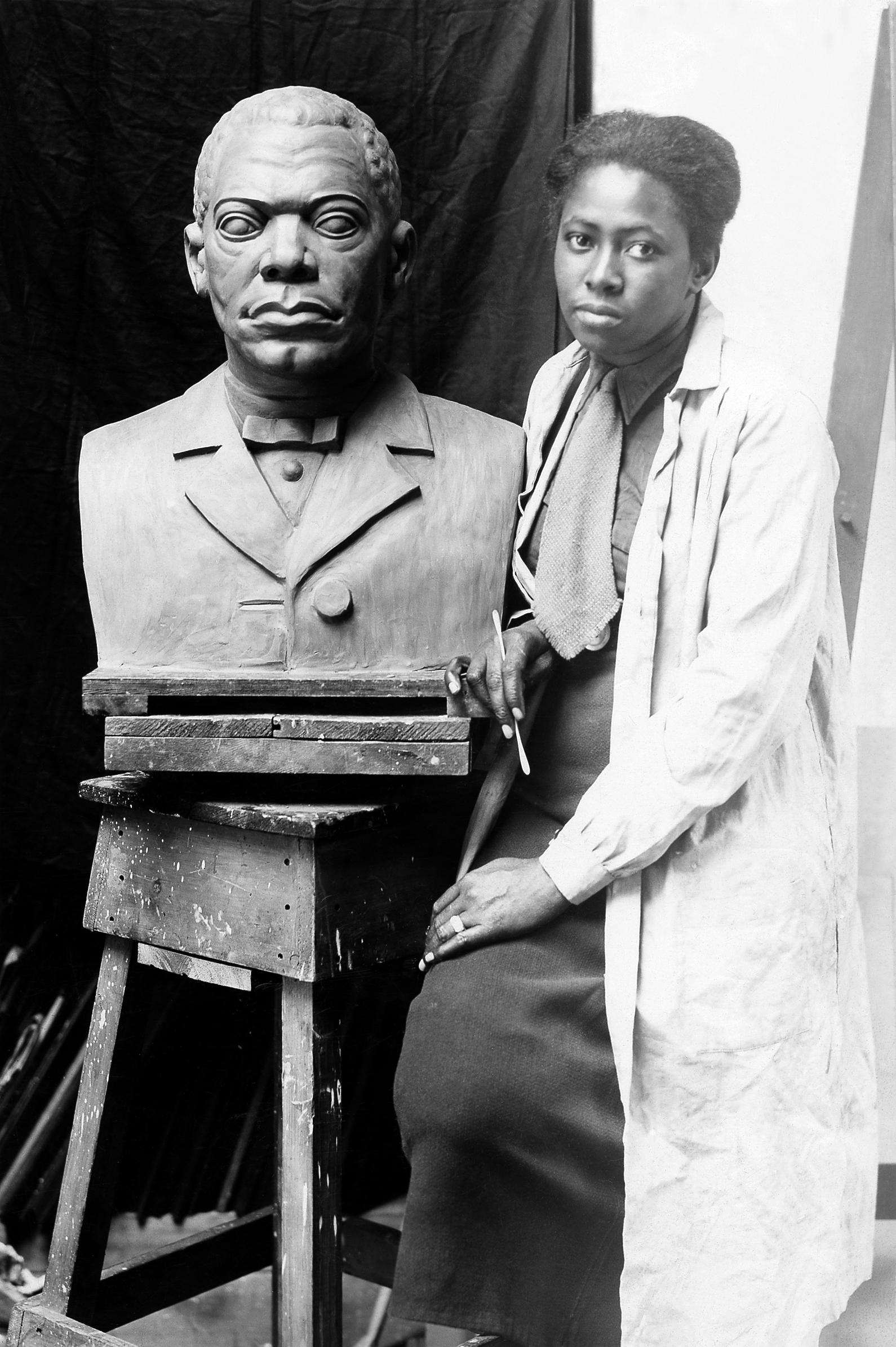
- Burke with her portrait bust of Booker T. Washington, c. 1935
- Born: Selma Hortense Burke; December 31, 1900; Mooresville, North Carolina, U.S.
- Died: August 29, 1995 (aged 94); New Hope, Pennsylvania, U.S.
- Education: Columbia University, Winston-Salem State University
- Known for: Sculpture
- Awards: Women's Caucus for Art Lifetime Achievement Award, 1979

Selma Hortense Burke (December 31, 1900 – August 29, 1995) was an American sculptor and a member of the Harlem Renaissance movement. Burke is best known for a bas relief portrait of President Franklin D. Roosevelt which may have been the model for his image on the obverse of the dime. She described herself as "a people's sculptor" and created many pieces of public art, often portraits of prominent African-American figures like Duke Ellington, Mary McLeod Bethune and Booker T. Washington. In 1979, she was awarded the Women's Caucus for Art Lifetime Achievement Award. She summed up her life as an artist, "I really live and move in the atmosphere in which I am creating".

== Biography ==
Selma Burke was born on December 31, 1900, in Mooresville, North Carolina, the seventh of 10 children of Reverend Neil and Mary Elizabeth Colfield Burke. Her father was an AME Church Minister who worked on the railroads for additional income. Her father died when she was twelve and in 1970 her mother was 101 years old. As a child, she attended a one-room segregated schoolhouse, and often played with the riverbed clay found near her home. She would later describe the feeling of squeezing the clay through her fingers as a first encounter with sculpture, saying "It was there in 1907 that I discovered me." Burke's interest in sculpture was encouraged by her maternal grandmother, a painter, although her mother thought she should pursue a more financially stable career. "You can't make a living at that," Burke recalls her mother saying about her desire to study art.

Burke attended Winston-Salem State University before graduating in 1924 from the St. Agnes Training School for Nurses in Raleigh. She married a childhood friend, Durant Woodward, in 1928, although the marriage ended with his death less than a year later. She later moved to Harlem to work as a private nurse. She was employed as a private nurse to a wealthy heiress. This heiress later became a patron of Burke and helped her become financially stable during the great depression.

=== Harlem Renaissance and education ===
After moving to New York City in 1935, Burke began art classes at Sarah Lawrence College. She also worked as a model in art classes to pay for that schooling. In 1935, during this time, she also became involved with the Harlem Renaissance cultural movement through her marriage with the writer Claude McKay, with whom she shared an apartment in the Hell's Kitchen neighborhood of Manhattan. The relationship was brief and tumultuous – McKay would destroy her clay models when he did not find the work to be up to his standards – but it introduced Burke to an artistic community that would support her burgeoning career. Burke began teaching for the Harlem Community Arts Center under the leadership of sculptor Augusta Savage, and would go on to work for the Works Progress Administration on the New Deal Federal Art Project. One of her WPA works, a bust of Booker T. Washington, was given to Frederick Douglass High School in Manhattan in 1936.

Burke traveled to Europe twice in the 1930s, first on a Rosenwald fellowship to study sculpture in Vienna in 1933-34. She returned in 1936 to study in Paris with Aristide Maillol. While in Paris she met Henri Matisse, who praised her work. One of her most significant works from this period is "Frau Keller" (1937), a portrait of a German-Jewish woman in response to the rising Nazi threat which would convince Burke to leave Europe later that year. With the onset of World War II, Burke chose to work in a factory as a truck driver for the Brooklyn Navy Yard. It was her opinion that, during the war, "artists should get out of their studios."

After returning to the United States, Burke won a graduate school scholarship to Columbia University, where she would receive a Master of Fine Arts degree in 1941.

=== Teaching and later life ===
In 1940 Burke founded the Selma Burke School of Sculpture in New York City. She was committed to teaching art. She opened the Selma Burke Art School in New York City in 1946, and later opened the Selma Burke Art Center in Pittsburgh, Pennsylvania. Open from 1968 to 1981, the center "was an original art center that played an integral role in the Pittsburgh art community," offering courses ranging from studio workshops to puppetry classes.

Burke used her art to make opportunities to bring people together. In Mooresville, black children were banned from use of the public library. With her rising fame, Burke chose to donate a bust of a local doctor on the condition that the ban be removed. The town accepted.

In 1949 Burke married architect Herman Kobbe, and moved with him to an artists' colony in New Hope, Pennsylvania. Kobbe died in 1955, but Burke continued to live in her New Hope home until her death in 1995, at the age of 94.

She taught at Livingstone College, Swarthmore College, and Harvard University, as well as Friends Charter School in Pennsylvania and Harlem Center in New York.

== Sculpture ==
Selma Burke sculpted portraits of famous African-American figures as well as lesser-known subjects. She also explored human emotion and family relationships in more expressionistic works. While she admired the abstract modernists, her work was more concerned with rendering the symbolic human form in ways both dignified and symbolic. She worked in a wide variety of media including wood, brass, alabaster, and limestone.

Burke's public sculpture pieces include a bust of Duke Ellington at the Performing Arts Center in Milwaukee, as well as works on display at the Hill House Center in Pittsburgh, the Schomburg Center for Research in Black Culture in New York City, Atlanta University, Spelman College, and the Smithsonian Museum of American Art. Her last monumental work, created in 1980 when she was 80 years old, is a bronze statue of Martin Luther King, Jr. in Charlotte, N.C.

Burke was among the artists featured at The National Urban League's inaugural exhibition at Gallery 62 in 1978. She had solo exhibitions at Princeton University and the Carnegie Museum, among other venues. Her work is held in the collections of the Metropolitan Museum of Art, the Whitney Museum of American Art, the Philadelphia Museum of Art, and the James A. Michener Museum of Art in Doylestown, Pennsylvania.

=== Portrait of F.D.R. ===
Burke's best-known work is a portrait honoring President Franklin D. Roosevelt and the Four Freedoms. In 1943, she competed in a national contest to win a commission for the sculpture, created from sketches made during a 45-minute sitting with Roosevelt at the White House. Burke herself "wrote to Roosevelt to request a live sitting, to which the president generously agreed, scheduling the first of two sittings on February 22, 1944." The President died before the third such appointment could be met. His wife Eleanor Roosevelt objected to how young Burke chose to present him, but she responded by saying, "This profile is not for today, but for tomorrow and all time." When asked about her experience sketching the president, "she said he wiggled too much when she began to sketch him that day. She told him to sit still and he did." The 3.5-by-2.5-foot plaque was completed in 1944 and unveiled by President Harry S. Truman in September 1945 at the Recorder of Deeds Building in Washington, D.C., where it still hangs today.

A number of sources contend that John R. Sinnock's obverse design on the Roosevelt dime was adapted from Burke's plaque even though Sinnock denied that Burke's portrait was an influence, pointing to his earlier work that predated Burke's. Sinnock's 1933 presidential medal for Roosevelt bears a striking resemblance to the 1946 dime, with Roosevelt facing the opposite direction. Roosevelt's 1941 inaugural medal, which Sinnock was involved in designing, also resembles the 1946 dime. Both the 1933 and 1941 medals predate Burke's bas relief.

Selected Works

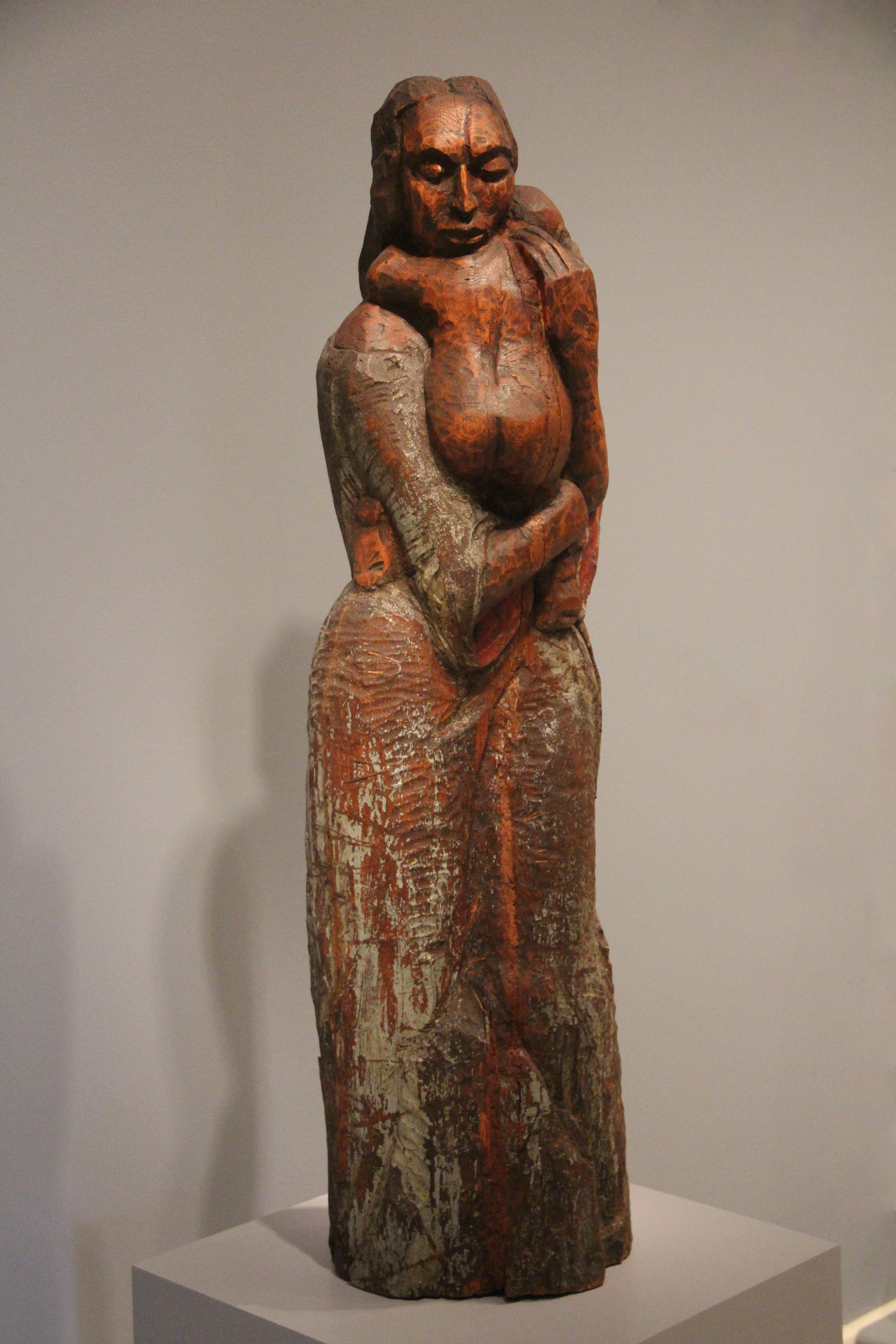
Untitled (Woman and Child), 1950

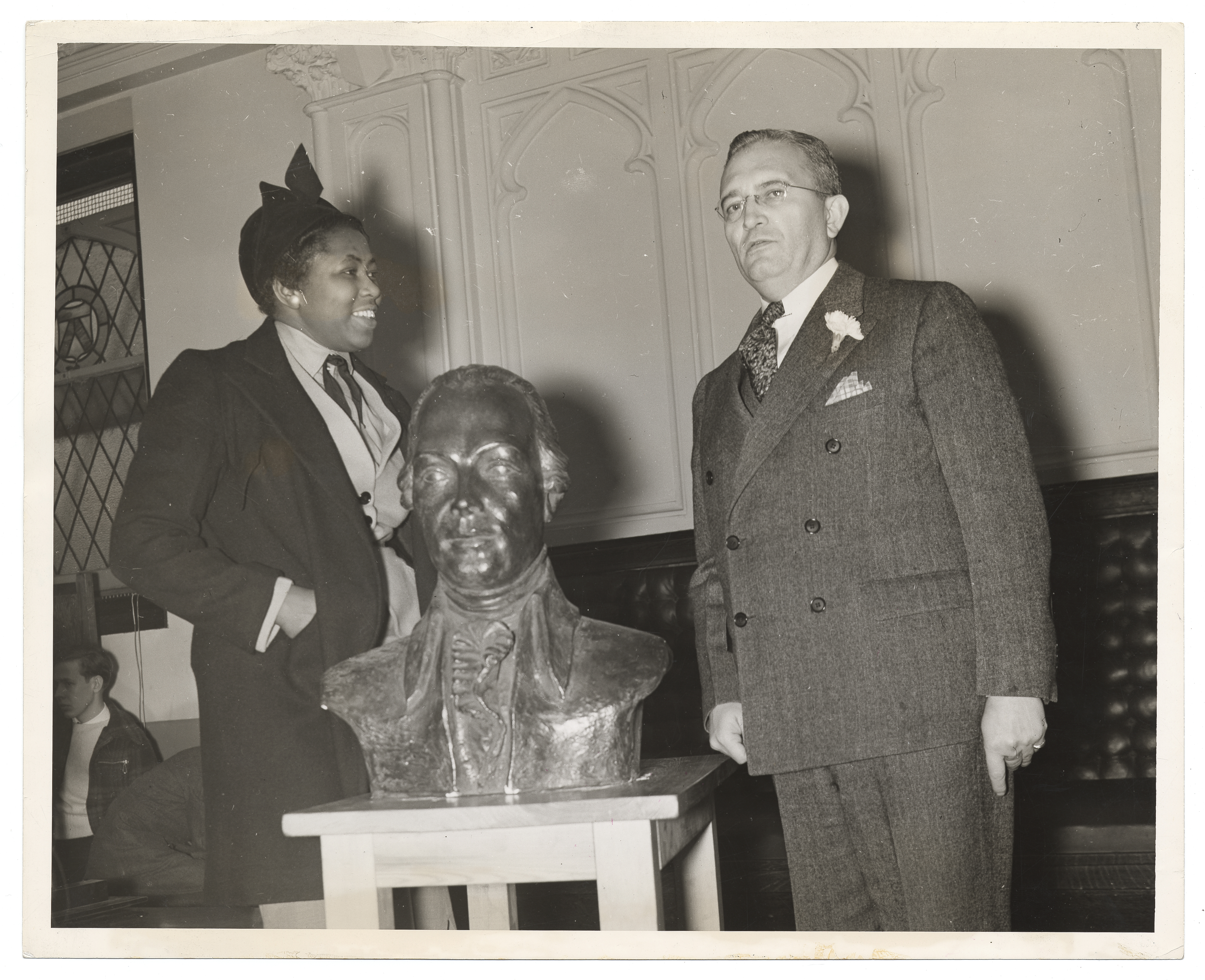
Burke, left, presenting her bust of Samuel Huntington (1938) to the principal of Samuel Huntington Junior High School in Jamaica, Queens

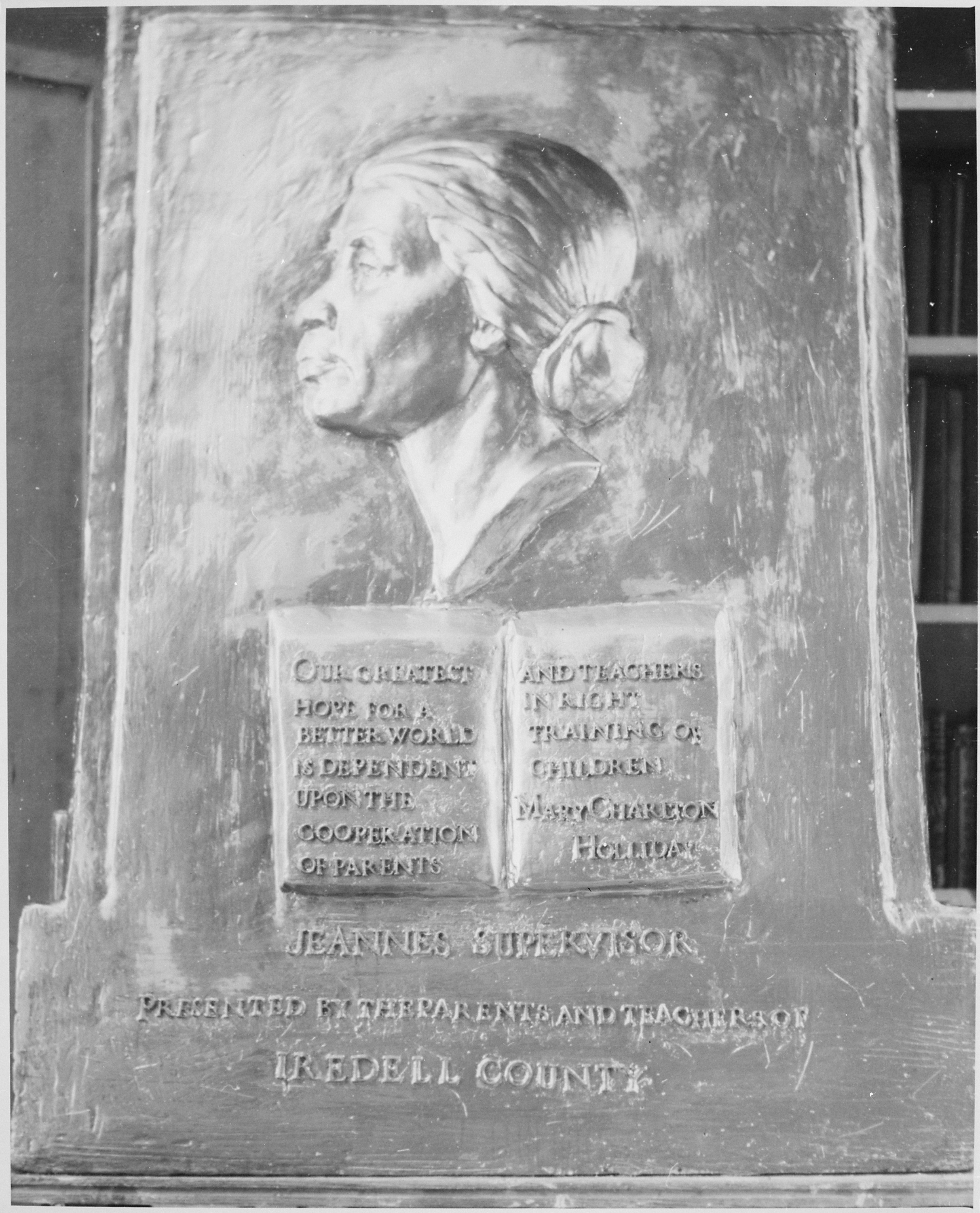
Bas-relief of Mary Charlton Holiday (1945) at the Iredell County Library, NC.

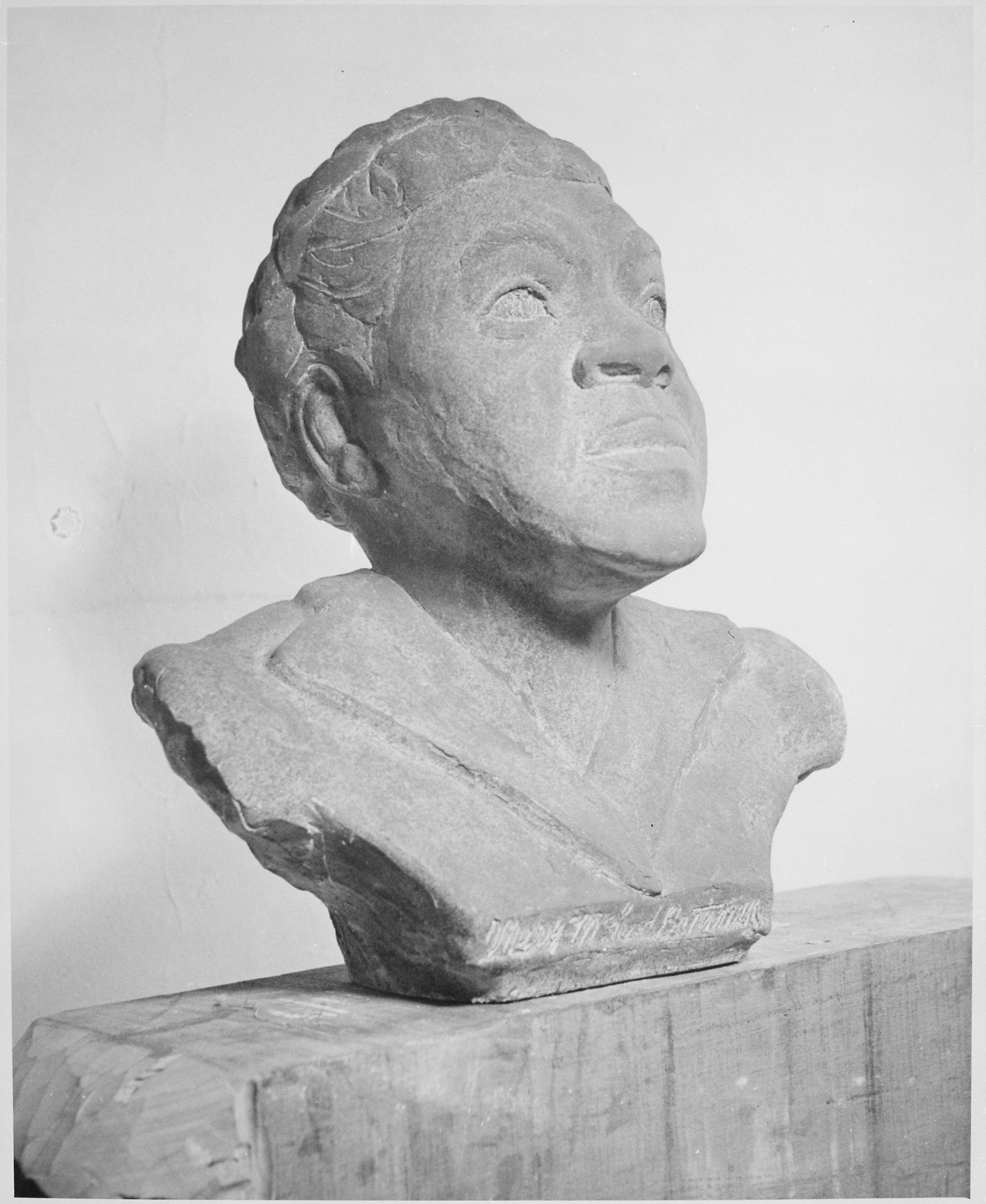
Bust of Mary McLeod Bethune

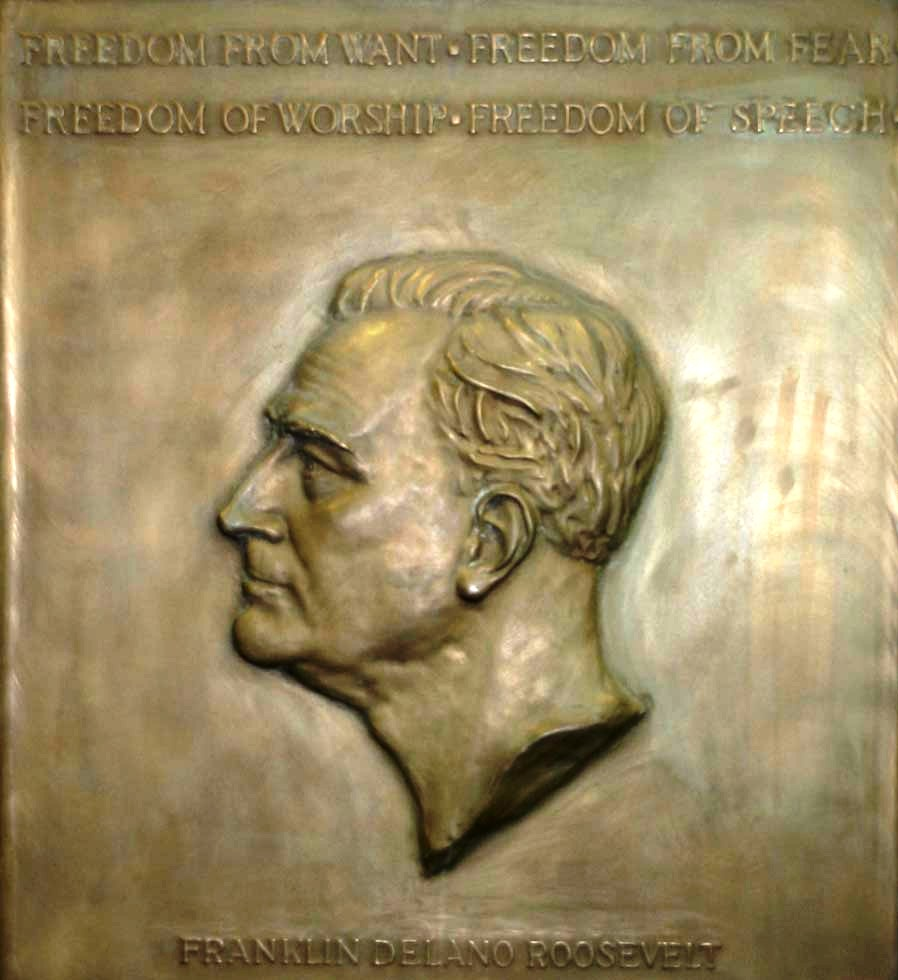
The Franklin Roosevelt plaque in the Recorder of Deeds Building in Washington.

== Honors ==
Burke is an honorary member of Delta Sigma Theta sorority. She received several honorary doctorate degrees during her lifetime, including one awarded by Livingston College in 1970 and one from Spelman College in 1988. Milton Shapp, then-governor of Pennsylvania, declared July 29, 1975, Selma Burke Day in recognition of the artist's contributions to art and education. Her papers and archive are in the collection of Spelman College.

Burke was a member of the first group of women – along with Louise Nevelson, Alice Neel, Georgia O'Keeffe, and Isabel Bishop – to receive lifetime achievement awards from the Women's Caucus for Art, in 1979. She received the award from President Jimmy Carter in a private ceremony in the Oval Office. She received a Candace Award from the National Coalition of 100 Black Women in 1983, the Pearl S. Buck Foundation Women's Award in 1988, and the Essence Magazine Award in 1989.

Her work was featured in the 2015 exhibition We Speak: Black Artists in Philadelphia, 1920s-1970s at the Woodmere Art Museum.

== Death ==
Selma Burke died at the age of 94 on August 29, 1995, in New Hope, Pennsylvania, where she had lived since the 1950s.
