= John R. Sinnock =

Chief Engraver of the US Mint (1925–1947)

John Sinnock
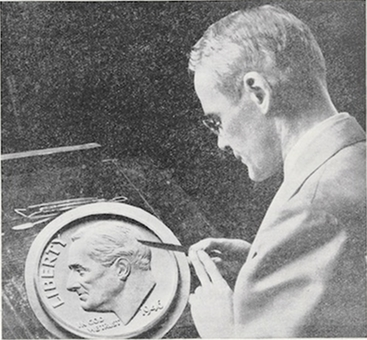
- Sinnock at work on plaster model of Roosevelt dime

8th Chief Engraver of the U.S. Mint
- In office 1925–1947
- Preceded by: George T. Morgan
- Succeeded by: Gilroy Roberts

Personal details
- Born: John Ray Sinnock; July 8, 1888 Raton, New Mexico, United States
- Died: May 14, 1947 (aged 58) Staten Island, New York, US
- Spouse(s): Jennie Alice (nee Peart), 1893-1968; m. 1914

John Ray Sinnock (July 8, 1888 – May 14, 1947) was the eighth Chief Engraver of the United States Mint from 1925 to 1947.

Dime engraved by John Sinnock
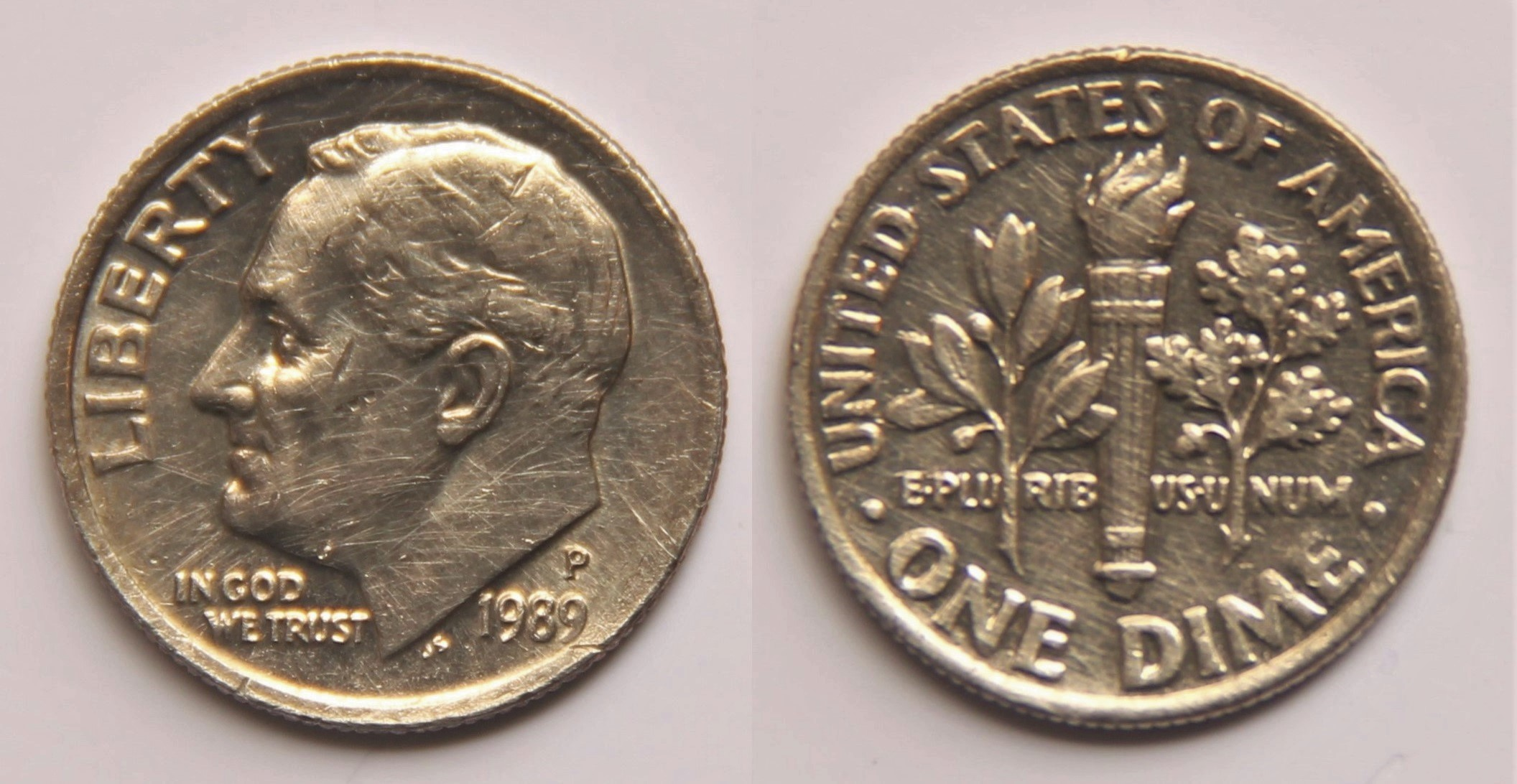
First side of the image: Obverse: Portrait of Franklin D. Roosevelt, year and US national motto (In God we trust).
Second side of the image: Reverse: E pluribus unum, olive branch, torch and oak branch surrounded with face value and lettering "United States of America".
Total 86,408,282,060 coins minted from 1965 to 2015.

== Early life ==
Sinnock was born July 8, 1888, in Raton, New Mexico, and attended the Pennsylvania Museum School of Industrial Art. He won the A.W. Mifflin Award for study abroad. His longtime confidante was Margaret Campbell, who inherited much of his artwork as well as his personal collection of materials related to the development of the Roosevelt Dime.

For ten years, Sinnock was an art instructor at both his alma mater and at Western Reserve University. He was appointed Assistant Engraver and Medalist at the Philadelphia Mint in 1917 before becoming the Chief Engraver in 1925.

== Career ==
Sinnock designed of the Roosevelt dime and Franklin half dollar, among other U.S. coins. His initials can be found at the base of the Roosevelt and Franklin busts. He also sculpted, although did not design, the second (and current) form of the Distinguished Service Cross, the Purple Heart medal, the Yangtze Service Medal, and various other medals and commemorative coins.

He designed the reverse of the 1918 Illinois Centennial half dollar, as well as the models for the 1926 Sesquicentennial half dollar and gold dollar.

Sinnock worked with the United States Assay Commission to design their annual medals in 1919, and again from 1927-42, 1944, and 1946-48.

In 1975, Sinnock's archives were donated to the American Numismatic Association; these include the original sketches of the Purple Heart medal.

== Controversies ==
Upon the initial minting of the Roosevelt dime in 1946, an urban legend arose in the United States that the letters "JS" actually stood not for John Sinnock, but for Joseph Stalin. The urban folk story coincided with the Second Red Scare. The rumor surfaced again after the release of the Sinnock designed Franklin half dollar in 1948.

Another controversy that surrounded the Roosevelt dime following its public release was an allegation that Sinnock copied or borrowed the design of the President's profile from a bronze bas relief created by sculptor Selma H. Burke for the dime's obverse. Sinnock denied this claim and said that the obverse portrait of the President was a composite of two studies that he made from life in 1933 and 1934. Sinnock said that he also consulted photographs of FDR and had the advice and criticism of two prominent sculptors who specialize in work in relief.

== See also ==
- Merchant Marine World War II Victory Medal

Government offices
Preceded by George T. Morgan	Chief Engraver of the U.S. Mint; 1925–1947	Succeeded by Gilroy Roberts
