= Marcel Sternberger =

Hungarian-American photographer

- Born: 1899
- Died: 1956
- Occupation: Photographer
- Spouse: Ilse
- Website: sternbergercollection.com

Marcel Sternberger (1899–1956) was a Hungarian-American photographer. He took portraits of many icons of his time including President Franklin Delano Roosevelt, Sigmund Freud, Frida Kahlo, Diego Rivera, Albert Einstein, H.G. Wells, George Bernard Shaw, Prime Ministers Jawaharlal Nehru and Indira Gandhi of India, and many others. His portrait of President Roosevelt became the image used as the model for the American dime. He served as "Private Photographer to the Belgian royal family" beginning in 1935 and his images of the royal children were printed on Belgian postage stamps, which bore his name.

Active from 1934 until his death in Christianburg, Virginia in 1956, his 22-year career spanned a tumultuous period in modern history. He began his life as a journalist, turning later to photography to capture events around him. While not a photojournalist in the traditional sense, his portraits of the world's political and cultural elite offered a glimpse into the personalities shaping events of the 20th century. Over the course of his professional life, he developed a technique for using light, positioning, and a contemporaneous interview of his subjects to create not only a striking image of an individual, but one that allowed for personality, emotion, and experience to be visually expressed.

== Early life and education ==
Born in Hungary in 1899, Sternberger came of age in the early days of World War I. Hailing from a family of Hungarian patriots, he joined the Austro-Hungarian Army upon graduating high school and served as an intelligence officer. When post-war borders shifted, the Sternbergers found their territory had been reappropriated to Romania, and the family consequently moved to Budapest. He studied law there until political and religious persecution compelled him to flee to the Czech border.

After a stint studying history in Prague, Sternberger attended the Sorbonne in Paris as a law student, ultimately earning a PhD. He began his journalistic career there writing for leading newspapers and magazines.

In 1932, he went to Berlin in the last days of the Weimar Republic where he met film student Ilse Naumann. They wed hastily in 1933, just before the Nazi confiscation of Jewish passports, and then returned to Paris. It was Ilse's gift of a Leica camera in 1934 that prompted Sternberger's interest in photography. A handheld Leica was to remain his camera of choice throughout his career.

== Career ==
=== Belgian royal family ===
An assignment from Le Soir sent the Sternbergers to Belgium. It was there that his career in photography began in earnest. Through the suggestion of the mayor of Antwerp, Camille Huysmans, Sternberger was invited to photograph the Belgian royal family. It was his first professional assignment, and he was subsequently named "Private Photographer to the Belgian royal family." His 1935 portrait of Queen Astrid taken shortly before her untimely death in a car accident endeared him to the family, with a print displayed in the King's private bedroom and five copies ordered by the Queen Mother as personal gifts for Christmas. His images of the royal children: Josephine Charlotte, Baudouin and Albert, were printed on Belgian postage stamps.

=== England ===
Anticipating Nazi expansion in 1936, the Sternbergers moved to London with their two children. His career as a portraitist flourished, and he photographed many famous sitters including George Bernard Shaw, H.G. Wells, Anthony Eden, and Sigmund Freud.

=== United States ===
Albert Einstein and Marcel Sternberger, Princeton, New Jersey, 1950

In 1938, he photographed U.S. Ambassador Joseph Kennedy, who used Sternberger's photograph in a Christmas card he sent to President Franklin Delano Roosevelt. Roosevelt consequently invited Sternberger to Washington, DC to shoot the portrait which was to become the image embossed on the American dime.

With the outbreak of World War II in 1939, Sternberger found himself stranded in North America, unable to return to England due to his Hungarian citizenship. In time, he was able to bring his family to join him in the United States, ultimately leaving behind most of their money and belongings.

He continued to photograph intellectual, political, and cultural leaders of the time among them Albert Einstein, Prime Minister Jawaharlal Nehru of India, and the Shah of Iran. He also went on to make portraits of MGM and 20th Century Fox movie stars.

In 1940, Sternberger began teaching a series of lectures at New York University entitled "Applied Psychology in Photographic Portraiture." It was an opportunity to formally present the psychological methods he had honed over years along with the lighting and positioning techniques he employed in his practice to infuse a photographic portrait with the personality of the sitter.

He was later to write an unpublished manuscript on the subject, through which he intended to describe how the essence of a sitter could be captured through precise technical and psychological procedures.

== Further reading and external links ==
http://www.sternbergercollection.com/

Loewentheil, Jacob (2016). The Psychological Portrait: Marcel Sternberger's Revelations in Photography. New York: Skira Rizzoli Publications, Inc.
