= Denver Mint =

- U.S. National Register of Historic Places
- U.S. Historic district – Contributing property
- Colorado State Register of Historic Properties
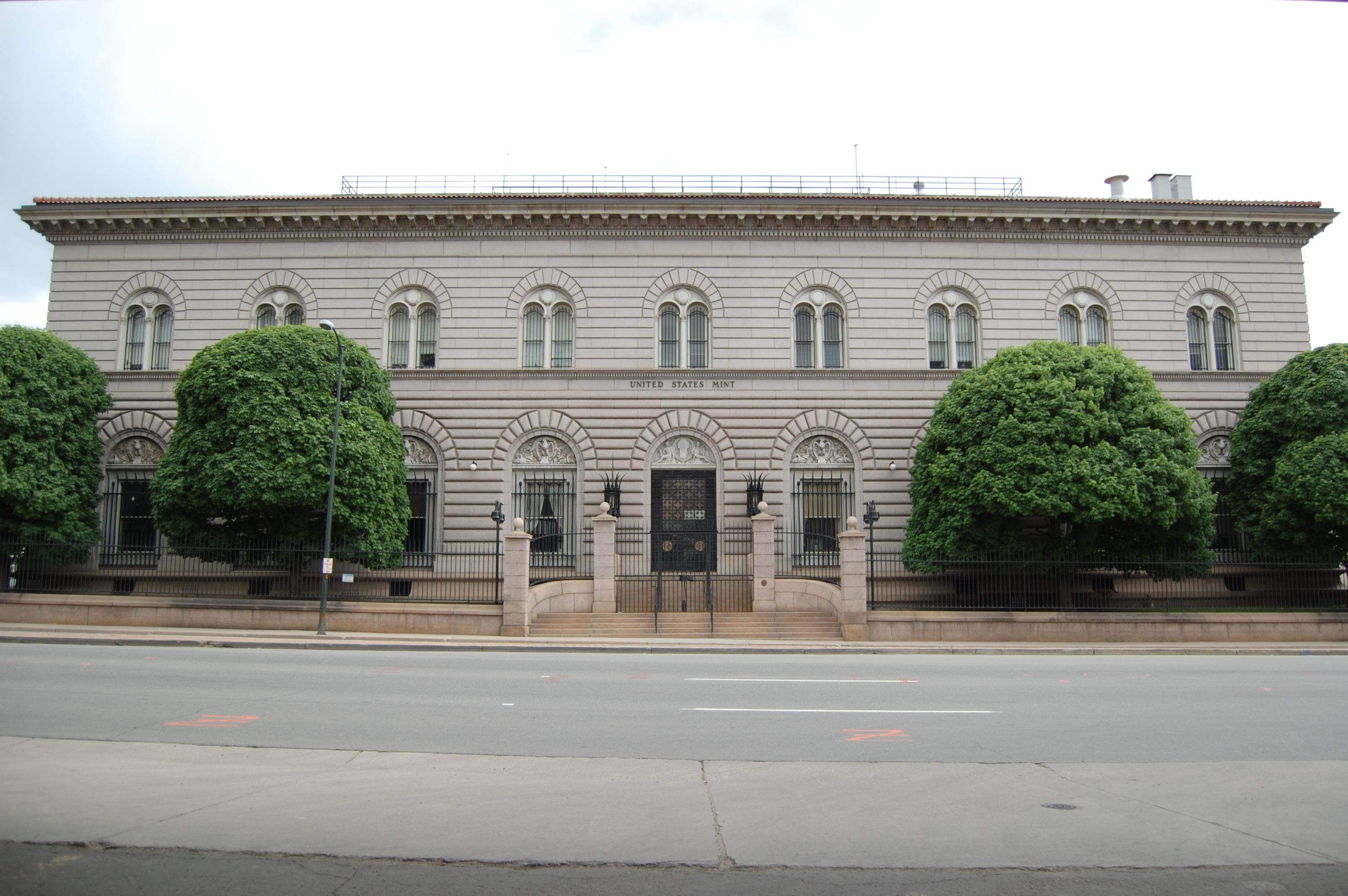
- The Denver Mint in 2007

- Location within Colorado Location within the United States
- Interactive map showing the location of Denver Mint
- Location: West Colfax Avenue and Delaware Street, Denver, Colorado
- Coordinates: 39°44′23″N 104°59′30.17″W
- Built: 1897
- Architect: James Knox Taylor
- Architectural style: Late 19th and 20th century revivals
- Part of: Civic Center Historic District (ID74002348)
- NRHP reference No.: 72000270
- CSRHP No.: 5DV.164

Significant dates
- Added to NRHP: February 1, 1972
- Designated CP: February 27, 1974

The Denver Mint is a branch of the United States Mint that struck its first coins on February 1, 1906. The mint is still operating and producing coins for circulation, as well as mint sets and commemorative coins. Coins produced at the Denver Mint bear a D mint mark (as did the Dahlonega Mint, which closed before the Denver branch opened). The Denver Mint is the single largest producer of coins in the world.

== History ==
=== Clark, Gruber & Co. ===
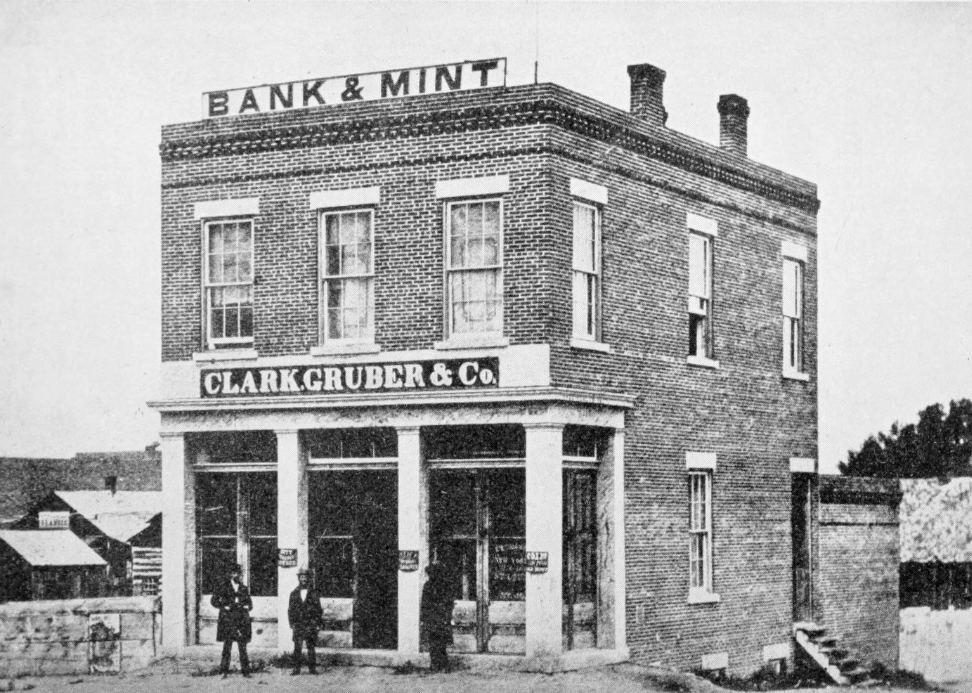

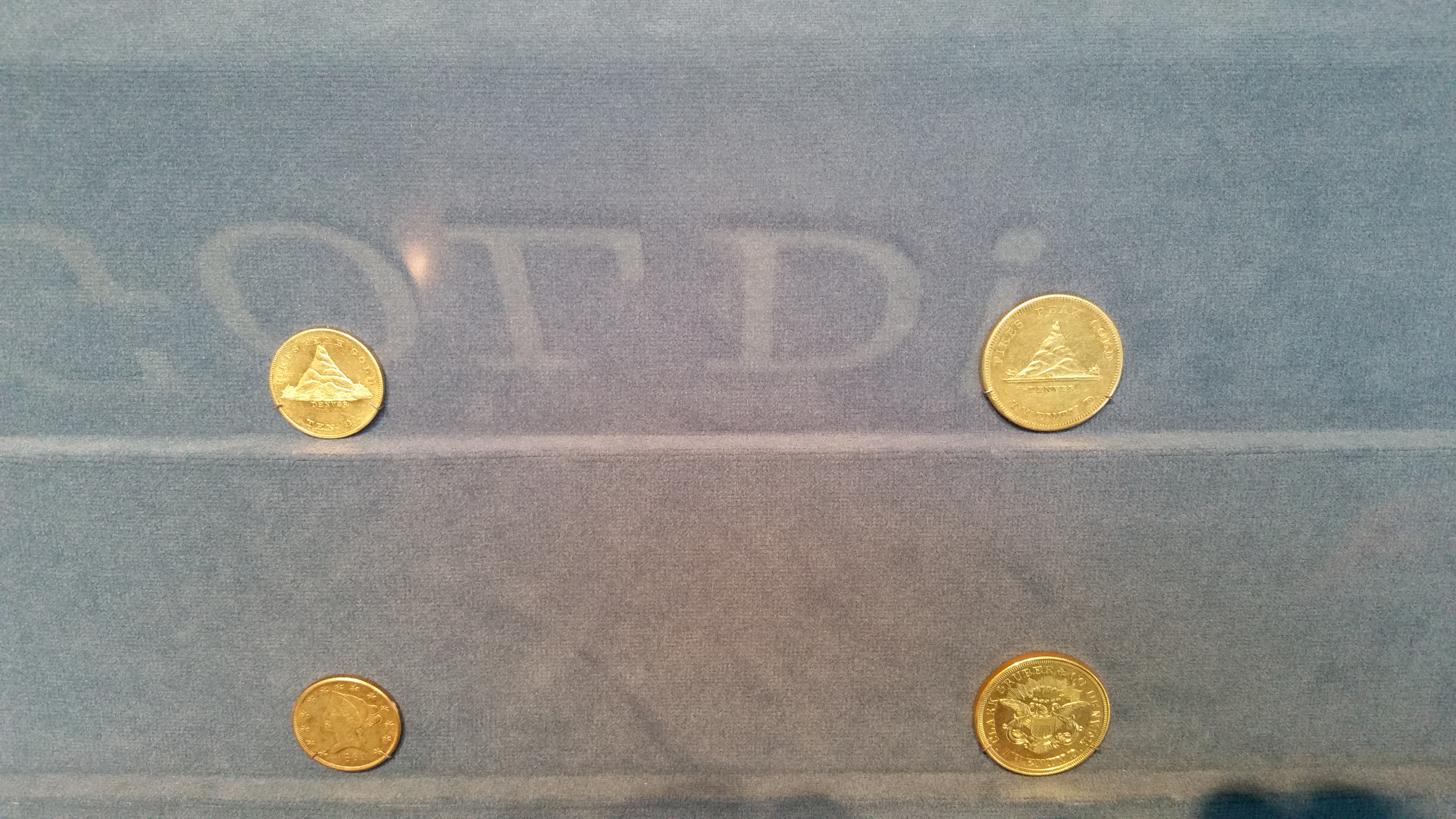
Clark, Gruber & Company gold coins on display at the History Colorado Center—a pair of $10 coins at left, and $20 coins at right, also known as eagles and double eagles, respectively

The predecessors of the Denver Mint were the men of Clark, Gruber and Company. During the Pikes Peak Gold Rush, they coined gold dust brought from the gold fields by the miners. In 1858, Austin M. Clark, Milton E. Clark and Emanuel Henry Gruber founded a brokerage firm in Leavenworth, Kansas, and then established an office in Denver at the beginning of the Colorado Gold Rush. Desiring to save on shipping and insurance costs associated with shipping gold back east, the firm opened a private mint. On July 25, 1860, the mint opened in a two-story brick building on the corner of Market and 16th Streets, minting $10 gold pieces at the rate of "fifteen or twenty coins a minute". "On the face is a representation of the peak, its base surrounded by a forest of timber and 'Pikes Peak Gold' encircling the summit. Immediately under its base is the word 'Denver', and beneath it 'Ten D.'. On the reverse is the American Eagle encircled by the name of the firm 'Clark, Gruber & Co.', and beneath the date, '1860'."

A $20 gold coin was added, "the weight will be greater, but the value the same as the United States coin of like denomination". A $5 and a $2.5 gold coin were added, with production reaching $18,000 per week. On the front was the "head of the Goddess of Liberty surrounded by thirteen stars, with "Clark & Company" in the tiara. "Pikes's Peak Gold, Denver" was on the other side, with "5D." or "2 1/2 D."

In the almost three years of operation, they minted $594,305 worth of Pike's Peak gold in the form of gold coins. Additionally, they purchased 77,000 troy ounces of raw gold, and shipped "large amounts of dust" to the Philadelphia Mint. The building, assaying and minting equipment was formally bought by the US Treasury in April 1863. Clark, Gruber & Co. remained a bank until bought by the First National Bank of Denver in 1865.

=== 1862 Act of Congress ===
Established by an Act of Congress on April 21, 1862, the United States Mint at Denver opened for business in late 1863 as a United States Assay Office. Operations began in the facilities of Clark, Gruber and Company, located at 16th and Market Streets and acquired by the government for $25,000.

Unlike Clark, Gruber and Company, though, the Denver plant performed no coinage of gold as first intended. One reason given by the Director of the Mint for the lack of coinage at Denver was, "…the hostility of the Indian tribes along the routes, doubtless instigated by rebel emissaries (there being a Civil War) and bad white men."

Gold and nuggets brought there by miners from the surrounding area were accepted by the Assay Office for melting, assaying, and stamping of cast gold bars. The bars were then returned to the depositors as imparted bars stamped with the weight and fineness of the gold. Most of the gold came from the rich beds of placer gold found in the streams and first discovered in 1858, the same year Denver was founded.

When the supply of gold was exhausted from the streams, the emphasis turned to lode mining, uncovering veins of ore with a high percentage of gold and silver. By 1859, the yearly value of the gold and silver deposited at the Assay Office was over $5.6 million. During its early years as an Assay Office, the Denver plant was the city's most substantial structure.

The United States Treasury did not expand its smelting and refining operations at the same rate as the discovery and production of gold. In 1872 a group of businessmen led by Judge Hiram Bond (formerly one of the largest brokers on the New York Gold Exchange), Joseph Miner and Denver Mayor Joseph E. Bates set up a firm Denver Smelting and Refining Works which built an independent complementary plant which processed ore into ingots which were then assayed, weighed and stamped by the Denver Mint.

=== Branch status ===
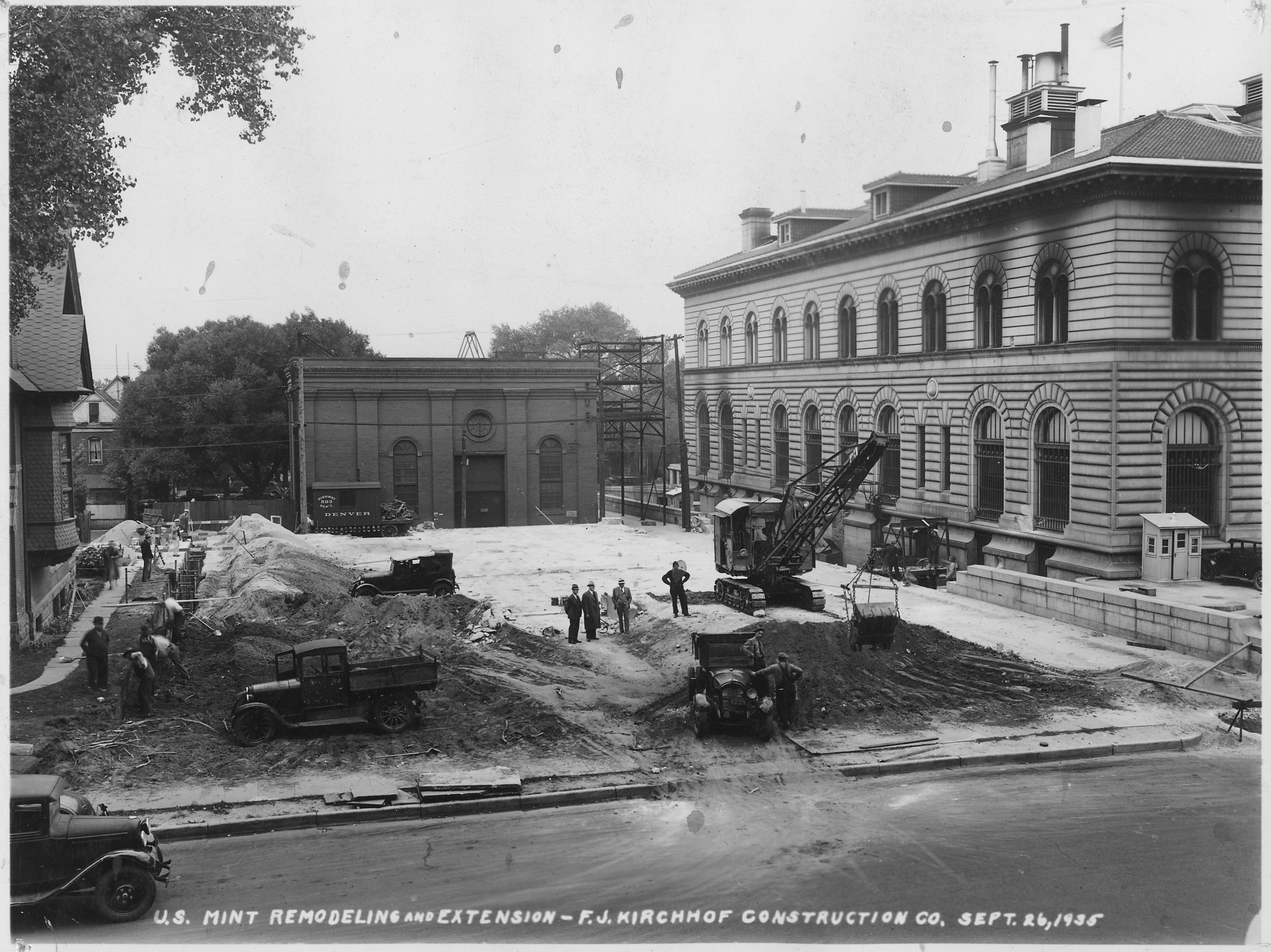
The Denver Mint during renovations in 1935

There was new hope for branch mint status when Congress provided for the establishment of a mint at Denver for gold and silver coin production. The site for the new mint at West Colfax and Delaware streets was purchased on April 22, 1896, for approximately $60,000. Construction began in 1897.

Appropriations to complete and equip the plant were insufficient, and the transfer of assay operations to the new building were delayed until September 1, 1904. Coinage operations finally began on February 1, 1906, advancing the status of the Denver facility to Branch Mint. In addition, before the new machinery to be used at the Mint was installed for use, it was first sent to the St. Louis Exposition of 1904 for display. Silver coins were minted in Denver for the first time in 1906. During the first year, 167 million coins were produced, including $20 gold (double eagle) coins, $10 gold (eagle) coins, $5 gold (half eagle) coins, and assorted denominations of silver coins.

The mint was individually listed on the National Register of Historic Places in 1972. It was further included as a contributing building in the listing of Civic Center Historic District in 1974.

Today, the Denver Mint produces commemorative coins, coin dies and uncirculated coin sets. It has a production capacity of more than 50 million coins a day and roughly 350 employees.

== Architecture ==
The current building, constructed 1904, is based on the Palazzo Medici-Riccardi in Florence, Italy. James Knox Taylor was the supervising architect in Washington, D.C., but the structure was designed by Tracy and Swartwout of New York City.

The structure's first level uses Pikes Peak granite, while the second floor is sided with gray granite ashlar. The granite cornice of the building is bracketed above a decorated frieze, and Ludowici tile covers the building's roof.

The Mint's lobby features murals by Vincent Aderente that represent mining, manufacturing, and commerce.

== Historical circulating coinage ==
Coin type	Series	Years minted	Image	Notes
Penny	Lincoln Wheat	1911–1920; 1922; 1924–1942; 1944–1958		
Penny	Lincoln Wheat	1943		Minted in zinc-coated steel for one year only in an attempt to save copper during World War II.
Penny	Lincoln Memorial	1959–2008		
Penny	Lincoln Bicentennial	2009		Four reverse designs.
Penny	Lincoln Shield	2010–2025		
Nickel	Buffalo	1912–1920; 1924–1929; 1934–1938		
Quarter	Washington	1965–1974; 1977–1998; 2021		No mint mark was used for circulation Denver quarters dated 1964 through 1967, thus these issues are indistinguishable from those produced in Philadelphia. The 2021 issue revived the obverse, and was paired with a new reverse featuring Washington Crossing the Delaware.
Quarter	Bicentennial Washington	1975–1976		
Quarter	50 State	1999–2008		5 reverse designs per year
Quarter	District of Columbia and United States Territories	2009		6 reverse designs
Quarter	America the Beautiful	2010–2021		5 reverse designs per year, except for 2021 which had one.
Quarter	American Women	2022–2025		5 reverse designs per year
Half dollar	Kennedy	1970–1974; 1977–2025		
Half dollar	Bicentennial Kennedy	1975–1976		
Dollar	Eisenhower	1971–1974; 1977–1978		
Dollar	Bicentennial Eisenhower	1976–1976		
Dollar	Susan B. Anthony	1979–1980		

=== Silver coins ===
Coin type	Series	Years minted	Image	Notes
Dime	Barber	1906–1913; 1914		
Dime	Mercury	1916–1921; 1924–1929; 1931; 1934–1945		
Quarter	Barber	1906–1911; 1913–1916		
Quarter	Standing Liberty	1917–1920; 1924; 1926–1929		
Quarter	Washington	1932; 1934–1937; 1939–1964		Composition changed to copper-nickel clad in 1965 (see above).
Half dollar	Barber	1906–1908; 1911–1913; 1915		
Half dollar	Walking Liberty	1916–1921; 1929; 1934–1939; 1941–1947		
Half dollar	Franklin	1948–1954; 1957–1963		
Half dollar	Kennedy	1964–1969		Kennedy halves produced between 1965 and 1967 were released without mint marks, thus these issues are indistinguishable from those produced in Philadelphia. Halves produced in 1964 were 90% silver, while those released between 1965 and 1969 were made of clad silver with an overall 40% fineness. Composition changed to copper-nickel clad in 1970 (see above).
Dollar	Morgan	1921		
Dollar	Peace	1922–1923; 1926–1927; 1934		

=== Gold coins ===
Coin type	Series	Years minted	Image	Notes
Quarter eagle	Indian Head	1911; 1914; 1925		
Half eagle	Liberty Head	1906–1907		
Half eagle	Indian Head	1908–1911; 1914		
Eagle	Liberty Head	1906–1907		
Eagle	Indian Head	1908–1911; 1914		
Double eagle	Liberty Head	1906–1907		
Double eagle	Saint-Gaudens	1908–1911; 1913–1914; 1923–1927; 1931		

== See also ==
- Federal Reserve Bank of Kansas City Denver Branch
- List of mints
- Historical United States mints
- Charlotte Mint
- Dahlonega Mint
- New Orleans Mint
- Philadelphia Mint
- San Francisco Mint
- Silver mining in Colorado
- Gold mining in Colorado
