= Gilroy Roberts =

American sculptor

9th Chief Engraver of the United States Mint
- In office 1948–1964
- Preceded by: John R. Sinnock
- Succeeded by: Frank Gasparro

Personal details
- Born: March 11, 1905 Philadelphia, Pennsylvania, U.S.
- Died: January 26, 1992 (aged 86) Havertown, Pennsylvania, U.S.
- Profession: Sculptor

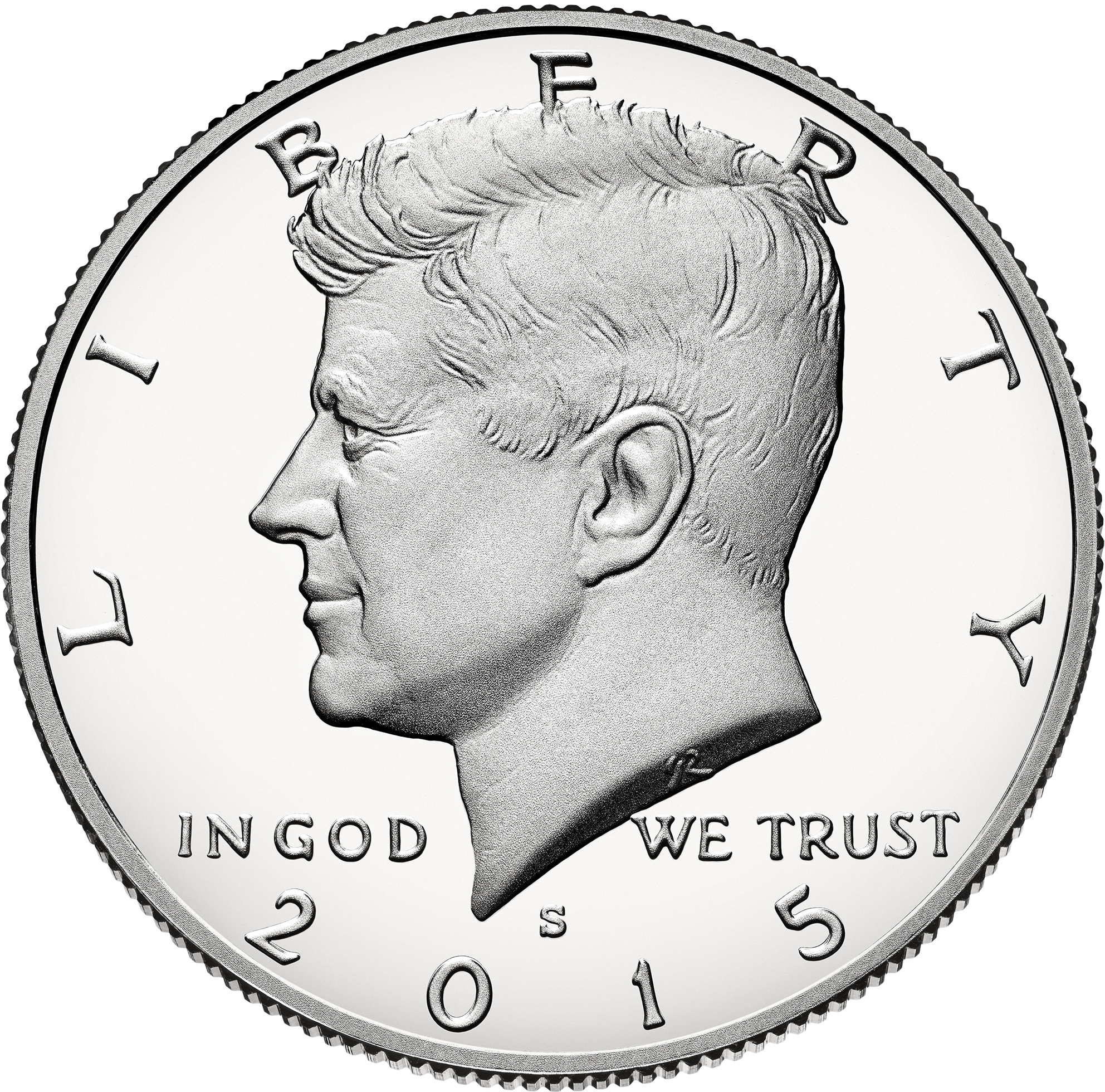
A half dollar obverse

Gilroy Roberts (March 11, 1905 – January 26, 1992) was an American sculptor. He served as the ninth Chief Engraver of the United States Mint from 1948 until 1964.

== Career ==
Roberts is perhaps most famous for designing the obverse of the Kennedy Half Dollar. At the Philadelphia Mint he was designing and engraving coins, and presidential and congressional medals. After being hired in 1936, Roberts worked as an understudy to John R. Sinnock. During his career, he engraved medals for Dwight D. Eisenhower, John F. Kennedy, and Lyndon B. Johnson.

Roberts retired from the U.S. Mint in 1964 to join The Franklin Mint, a private foundation that was established in the same year. He is the first Chief Engraver to retire from the position, as each of his predecessors held the position until their deaths.

Roberts appeared as himself on the April 20, 1964 episode of the CBS gameshow To Tell The Truth.

== Personal life ==
Roberts married Lillian Sharpless Pancoast in 1927, and they had a son.

Government offices
Preceded by John R. Sinnock	Chief Engraver of the U.S. Mint; 1948–1964	Succeeded by Frank Gasparro
