= Special Olympics World Games silver dollar =

1995 US commemorative coin

- United States
- Value: 1 US dollar
- Mass: 26.73 g
- Diameter: 38.1 mm (1.500 in)
- Edge: Reeded
- Composition: 90% Ag, 10% Cu
- Years of minting: 1995
- Mint marks: P (proof); W (uncirculated)

Obverse
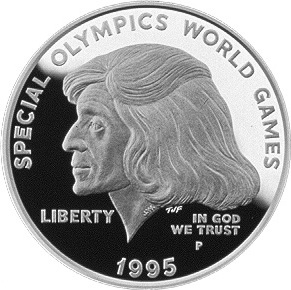
- Design: Eunice Kennedy Shriver
- Designer: Jamie Wyeth
- Design date: 1995

Reverse
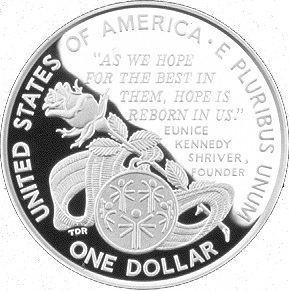
- Design: Special Olympics Medal, a rose and quote
- Designer: Thomas D. Rogers
- Design date: 1995

The Special Olympics World Games silver dollar is a commemorative silver dollar issued by the United States Mint in 1995 which honors the Special Olympics and its founder, Eunice Kennedy Shriver.

The obverse of the coin depicting Shriver became a subject of controversy for coin collectors. The Citizens Coinage Advisory Committee and the Commission of Fine Arts opposed depicting a living person on commemorative coins. Treasury Secretary Robert E. Rubin approved the design despite the objections. Shriver became the fifth living person, and first living woman, depicted on United States coinage. (Note: Depicted prior were Thomas Kilby on the Alabama Centennial half dollar, Calvin Coolidge on the U.S. Sesquicentennial half dollar, Joseph T. Robinson on the Arkansas–Robinson half dollar, and Carter Glass on the Lynchburg Sesquicentennial half dollar) Director of the Mint Philip N. Diehl hoped the controversy would boost sales, calling it "a blessing and a curse".

== See also ==
- List of United States commemorative coins and medals (1990s)
- United States commemorative coins
