= United States Sesquicentennial coinage =

1926 commemorative US half dollar and quarter eagle

Sesquicentennial half dollar
- Value: 50 cents (0.50 US dollars)
- Mass: 12.50 g
- Diameter: 30.6 mm
- Thickness: 1.8 mm
- Edge: reeded
- Composition: 90 % silver; 10 % copper
- Silver: 0.36169 troy oz
- Years of minting: 1926
- Mint marks: None. All pieces struck at Philadelphia Mint without mint mark.

Obverse
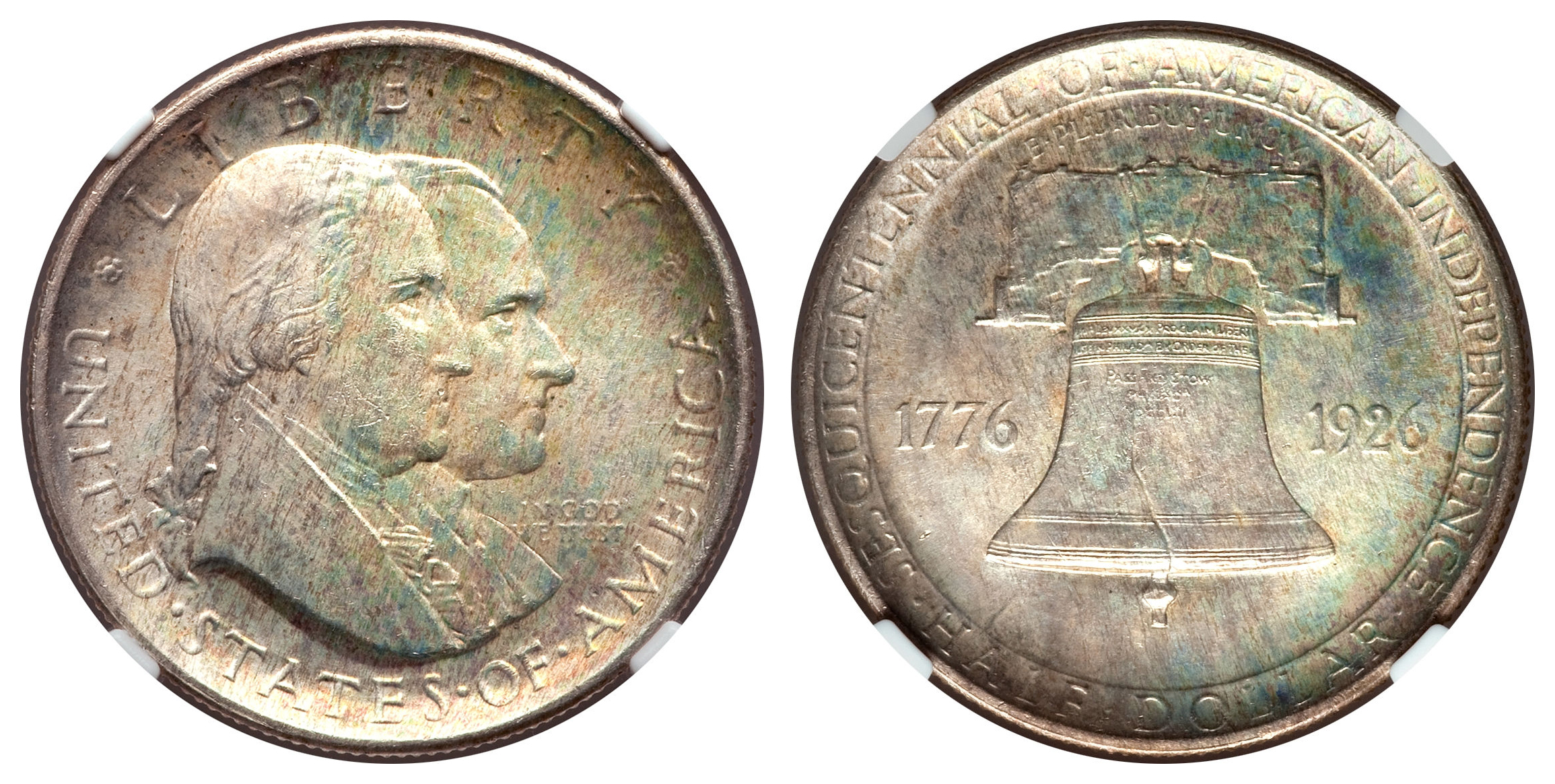
- Design: Jugate heads of George Washington and Calvin Coolidge
- Designer: Modeled by John R. Sinnock from designs by John Frederick Lewis
- Design date: 1926

Reverse
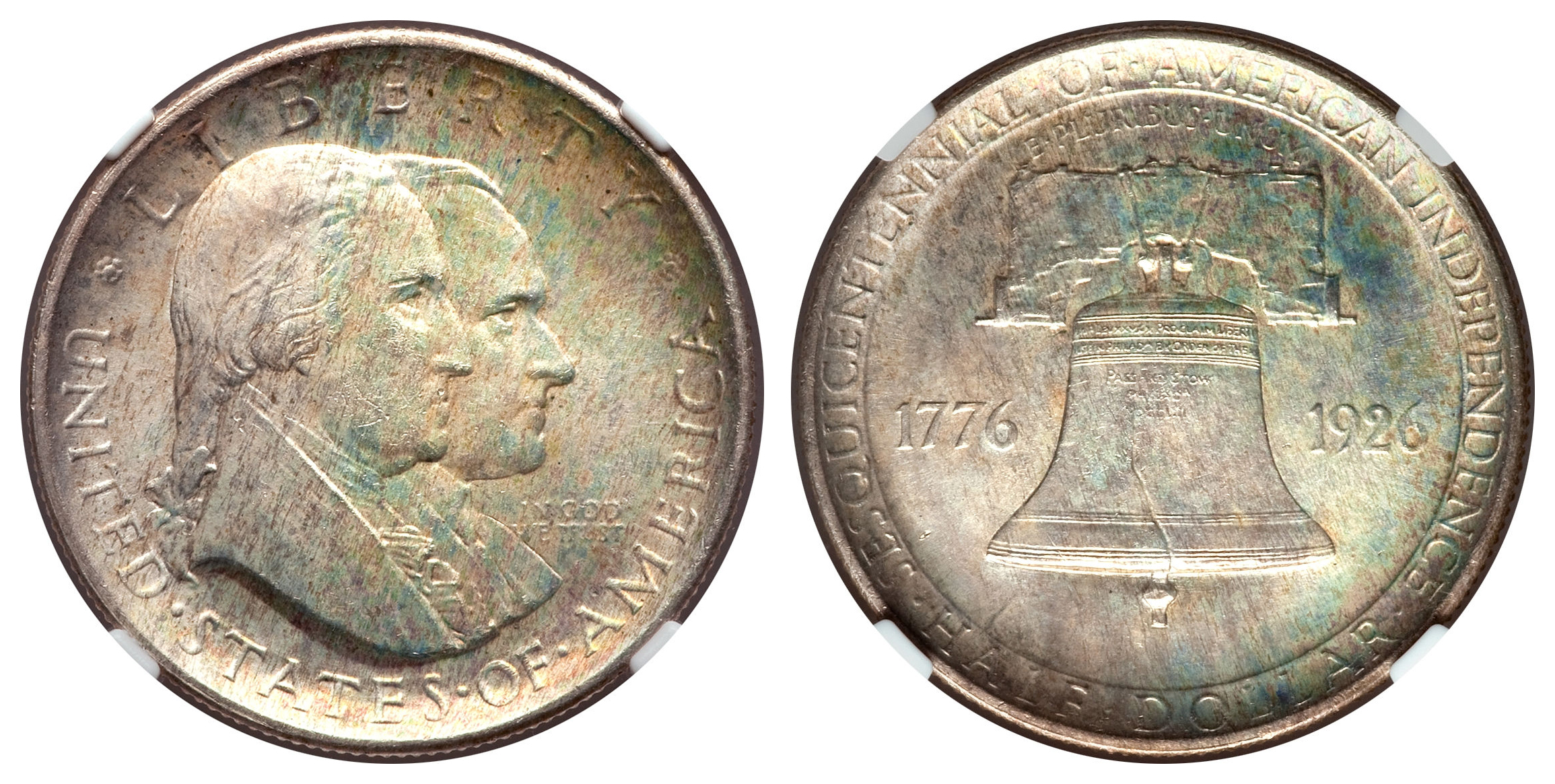
- Design: The Liberty Bell
- Designer: Modeled by John R. Sinnock from designs by John Frederick Lewis
- Design date: 1926

Sesquicentennial quarter eagle ($2.50)
- United States
- Value: 2.5 United States dollars
- Mass: 4.18 g
- Diameter: 18 mm
- Edge: reeded
- Composition: .900 gold, .100 copper
- Gold: .12094 troy oz
- Years of minting: 1926
- Mint marks: None. All pieces struck at Philadelphia Mint without mint mark.

Obverse
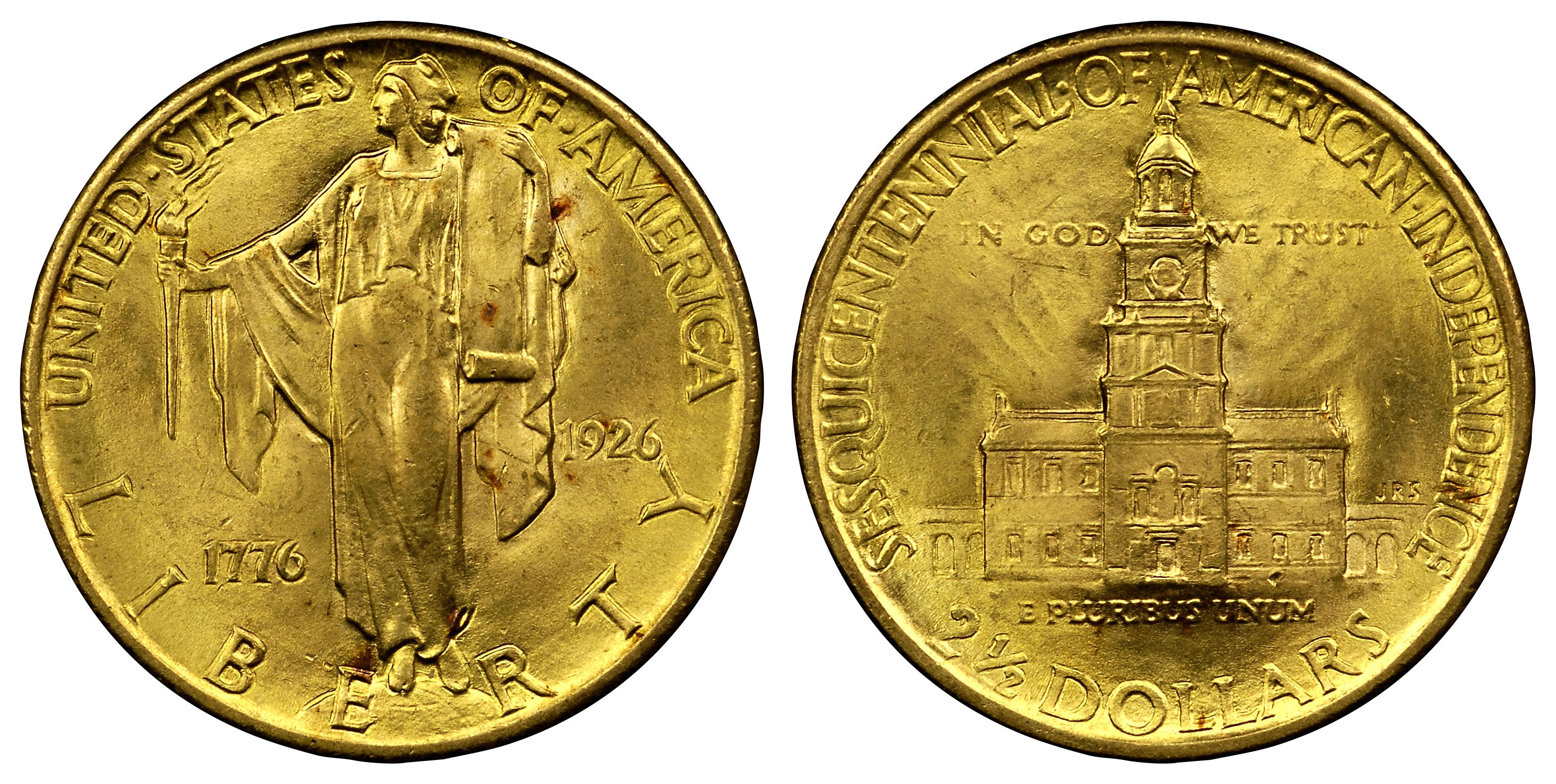
- Design: Liberty, bearing a scroll representing the United States Declaration of Independence and a torch
- Designer: John R. Sinnock
- Design date: 1926

Reverse
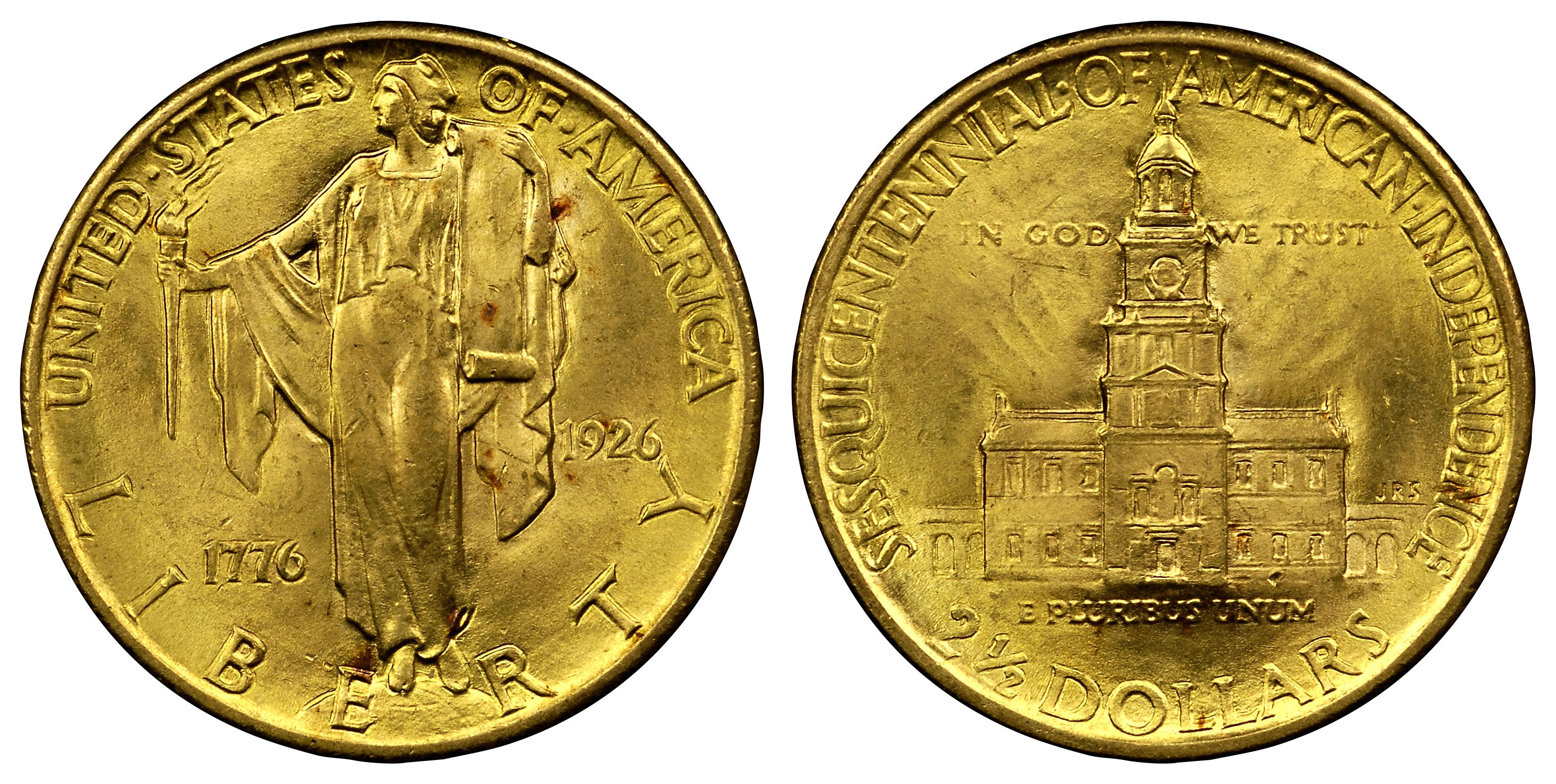
- Design: Independence Hall, with a rising Sun behind it
- Designer: John R. Sinnock
- Design date: 1926

The United States Sesquicentennial coin issue consisted of a commemorative half dollar and quarter eagle (gold $2.50 piece) struck in 1926 at the Philadelphia Mint for the 150th anniversary of American independence. The obverse of the half dollar features portraits of the first president, George Washington, and the president in 1926, Calvin Coolidge, making it the first American coin to depict a president in his lifetime. (Note: The only other was Donald Trump for the United States Semiquincentennial coinage in 2026. Other people on US coins minted during their lifetimes: Thomas Kilby appeared on the Alabama Centennial half dollar in 1921, and in 1936, Joseph Taylor Robinson appeared on the Arkansas-Robinson half dollar and Carter Glass appeared on the Lynchburg Sesquicentennial half dollar. In 1995 Eunice Kennedy Shriver appeared on the Special Olympics World Games silver dollar and in 2016 Nancy Reagan on a First Spouse Gold Coin, although that was officially released after she had died.)

By the March 1925 Act of Congress, by which the National Sesquicentennial Exhibition Commission was chartered, Congress also allowed it to purchase 1,000,000 specially designed half dollars and 200,000 quarter eagles, which could be sold to the public at a premium. The Commission had trouble agreeing on a design with Mint Chief Engraver John R. Sinnock, and asked Philadelphia attorney, arts patron and numismatist John Frederick Lewis (1860–1932) to submit sketches. These were adapted by Sinnock, without giving credit to Lewis, whose involvement would not be generally known for forty years.

Both the quarter eagle, designed by Sinnock, and the half dollar were struck in the maximum number authorized, but many were returned to the Mint for melting when they failed to sell. The Liberty Bell reverse for the half dollar was later reused by Sinnock, again without giving Lewis credit, on the Chief Engraver's Franklin half dollar, which was first minted in 1948.

== Inception ==
Legislation for a commemorative coin to mark the 150th anniversary of American independence was introduced on behalf of the United States National Sesquicentennial Exhibition Commission, which was charged with organizing what became known as the Sesquicentennial Exposition in Philadelphia. In the Act of March 3, 1925, Congress both chartered the Commission and allowed one million half dollars and 200,000 quarter eagles to be struck in commemoration of the Sesquicentennial of American Independence. These coins would be sold only to the Commission, at face value; it could then retail them to the public at a premium. Profits would go to financing the Exposition.

The original version of the bill, introduced in the House of Representatives on February 16, 1925 by Pennsylvania Congressman George P. Darrow and in the Senate by that state's George W. Pepper, called for a $1.50 gold coin for the 150th anniversary, for commemorative half dollars, and for a $1 bill honoring the Declaration of Independence. A hearing was held before the House Committee on Industrial Arts and Expositions two days later, at which Congressman Darrow predicted that the $1.50 gold pieces would not be opposed by either the Treasury or the Committee on Coinage, Weights, and Measures, but he was incorrect; Treasury Secretary Andrew W. Mellon would not support them. The Commission also hoped to have commemoratives depicting the enlargement of the country through acquisitions such as the Louisiana Purchase and the Annexation of Texas, but these were not included in the final version of the bill. Nevertheless, the Commission continued to pursue congressional approval of the $1.50 piece and the other proposed commemoratives at least through August 1925.

In May, H. P. Caemmerer, secretary of the Commission of Fine Arts, a body charged with making recommendations on the approval of coinage design, wrote to the Sesquicentennial Commission, asking what they proposed to do about the coins. Having received no reply, he wrote again in late August, this time to Milton Medary, a member of the Fine Arts Commission, asking what progress had been made. Medary replied that the Sesquicentennial Commission was in touch with the new Chief Engraver at the Philadelphia Mint, John R. Sinnock (his predecessor, George T. Morgan, had died in January), but that Sinnock had not yet submitted satisfactory designs.

Apparently dissatisfied with Sinnock's work, the Sesquicentennial Commission hired John Frederick Lewis to create designs. Lewis, who served as president of the Pennsylvania Academy of Fine Arts from 1906 until his death in 1932, was known as a numismatist, but not as an artist. On December 8, 1925, Sesquicentennial Commission director Asher C. Baker submitted Lewis's sketches, which appear much like the present half dollar, to Fine Arts Commission chairman Charles Moore. Baker referred to Lewis's "designs for the coins", which may mean that he submitted sketches for the quarter eagle as well, but if so, they are not extant and were not acted upon by the Fine Arts Commission. The half dollar designs were approved by the Fine Arts Commission, on condition the sketches were converted into models by a competent sculptor, and Moore sent them on December 11 to Mint Director Robert J. Grant. The resultant plaster models, made by Sinnock, were submitted to the Fine Arts Commission on March 13, 1926, and were undoubtedly endorsed, but the approval letter is lost.

Sinnock's sketches for the quarter eagle were sent to the Fine Arts Commission on February 27, 1926, and were forwarded to sculptor member Lorado Taft for his views. Moore sent his commission's approval to Grant on March 26, with several recommendations, including that the motto E Pluribus Unum, present on the obverse in Sinnock's sketches, and the Sun's rays on the reverse, be omitted. The rays were not removed, and the motto was moved to the reverse. Approval of the models followed in April, again with minor suggestions.

== Design ==
The obverse of the half dollar features jugate busts of George Washington, first president of the United States, and Calvin Coolidge, the president in 1926. According to Anthony Swiatek and Walter Breen, "both were mistakes. Washington was not president of the Continental Congress in 1776, and Coolidge's likeness was illegal. By an 1866 Act of Congress, no living person could be portrayed on U.S. coins or currency; but this law had been many times violated and would be again." Although Sinnock had not previously designed a coin showing a president, he had created presidential medals under Chief Engraver Morgan's direction. Other living Americans, including Virginia Senator Carter Glass, have appeared on commemorative coinage, but Coolidge is the only president to appear on a U.S. coin in his lifetime. The Liberty Bell appears on the reverse, making the Sesquicentennial half dollar the first U.S. coin to bear private advertising—that is, the legend "Pass and Stow" on the bell, for the long-defunct partnership of John Pass and John Stow, who recast the bell after it initially broke in 1752. Sinnock's initials JRS are on the obverse, on the truncation of Washington's bust.

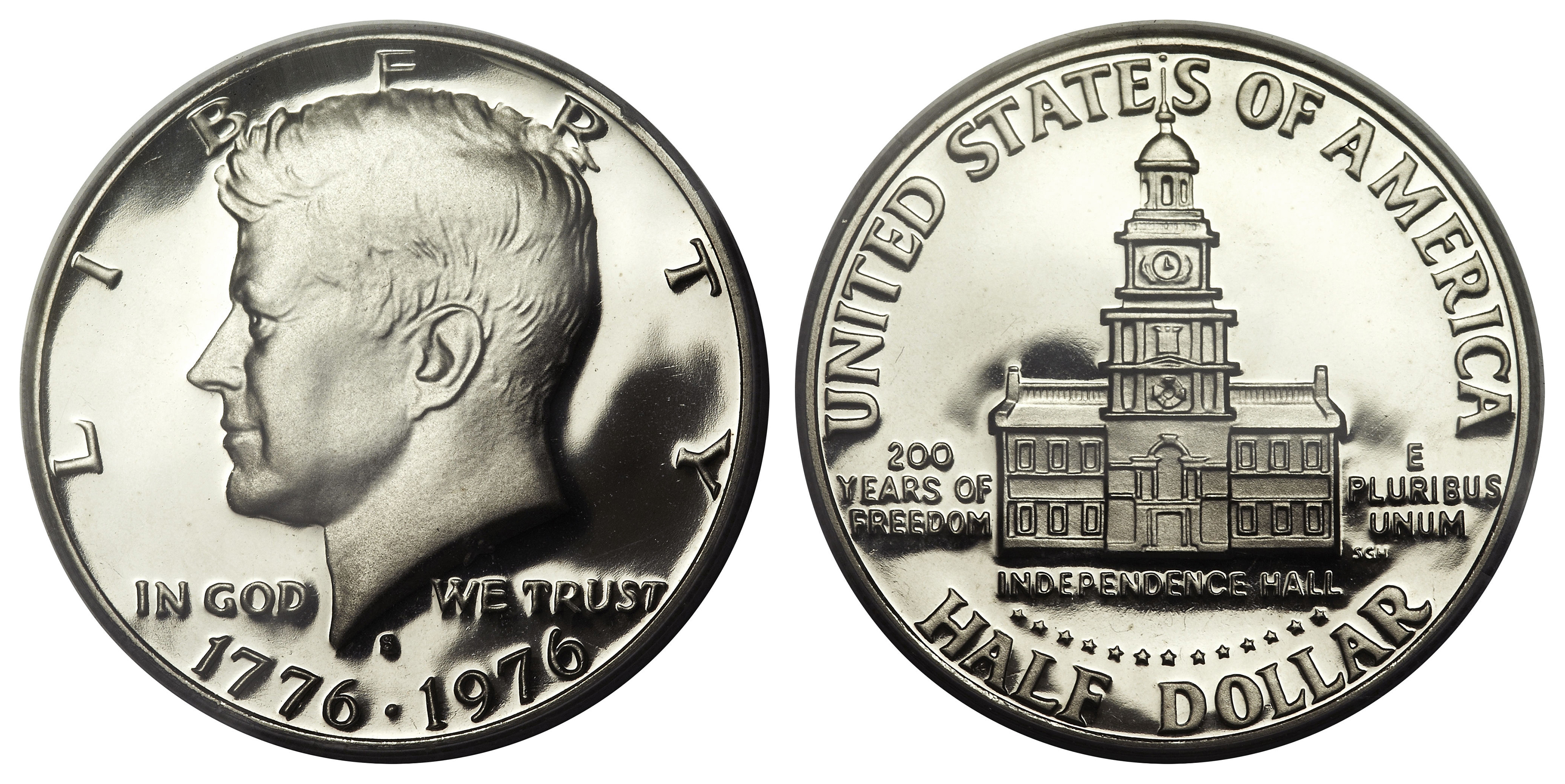
The Bicentennial half dollar resembles the earlier quarter eagle.

Swiatek and Breen describe the obverse of the quarter eagle as "very Art Deco". Liberty appears on it, wearing a liberty cap and holding both a scroll representing the United States Declaration of Independence and a torch likely intended to recall the Statue of Liberty. The reverse depicts Independence Hall, where the Declaration of Independence was signed, and the rising Sun behind it. Sinnock's initials are to the right, above the right wing of the building. Bowers pointed out that the depiction of Independence Hall closely resembles that on the Bicentennial half dollar, struck a half century later. As no clock hands are seen on the bell tower of the building on the quarter eagle, it is not possible to say what time is intended—on the Bicentennial half dollar, the time is 3:00.

At the insistence of the Sesquicentennial Commission, the coins were minted in very shallow relief, and thus struck up poorly. Coin dealer and numismatic author Q. David Bowers opined, "from the standpoint of aesthetic appeal the [half dollar] is at the bottom of the popularity charts along with the 1923-S Monroe half dollar".

Art historian Cornelius Vermeule took a more positive view of the two coins. Commenting on the half dollar obverse, he praised its technical aspects, showing the Mint had learned something from earlier attempts at coin redesign. He admired the reverse, calling the bell and the lettering "jewels of precision". For the quarter eagle obverse, with its figure of a robed Liberty standing on a globe, Vermeule suggested that Sinnock "revert[ed] in part to the allegorical iconography of the nineteenth century." He felt that the Liberty allegory is too blatant, with scroll and torch, and noted that Sinnock eventually found a more proper place for his torch on the Roosevelt dime (1946). The figure itself, despite classical robes, "looks more like a 'flapper' of the 1920s. Her cloth cap accentuates this," according to Vermeule. The reverse, in Vermeule's view, was part of a tradition of realistic views of structures on U.S coins that would repeat itself with the Jefferson nickel (1938).

== Distribution and aftermath ==
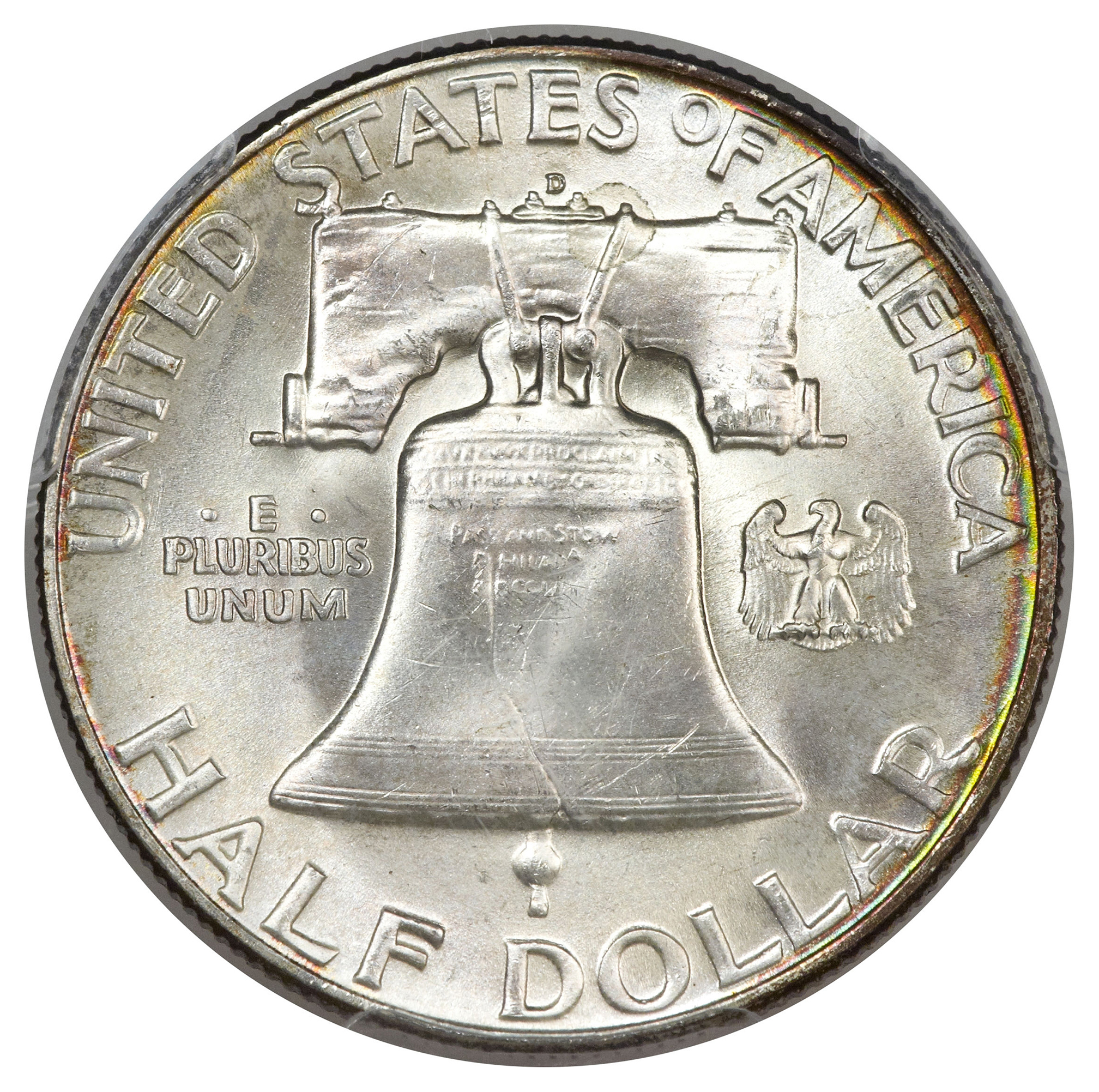
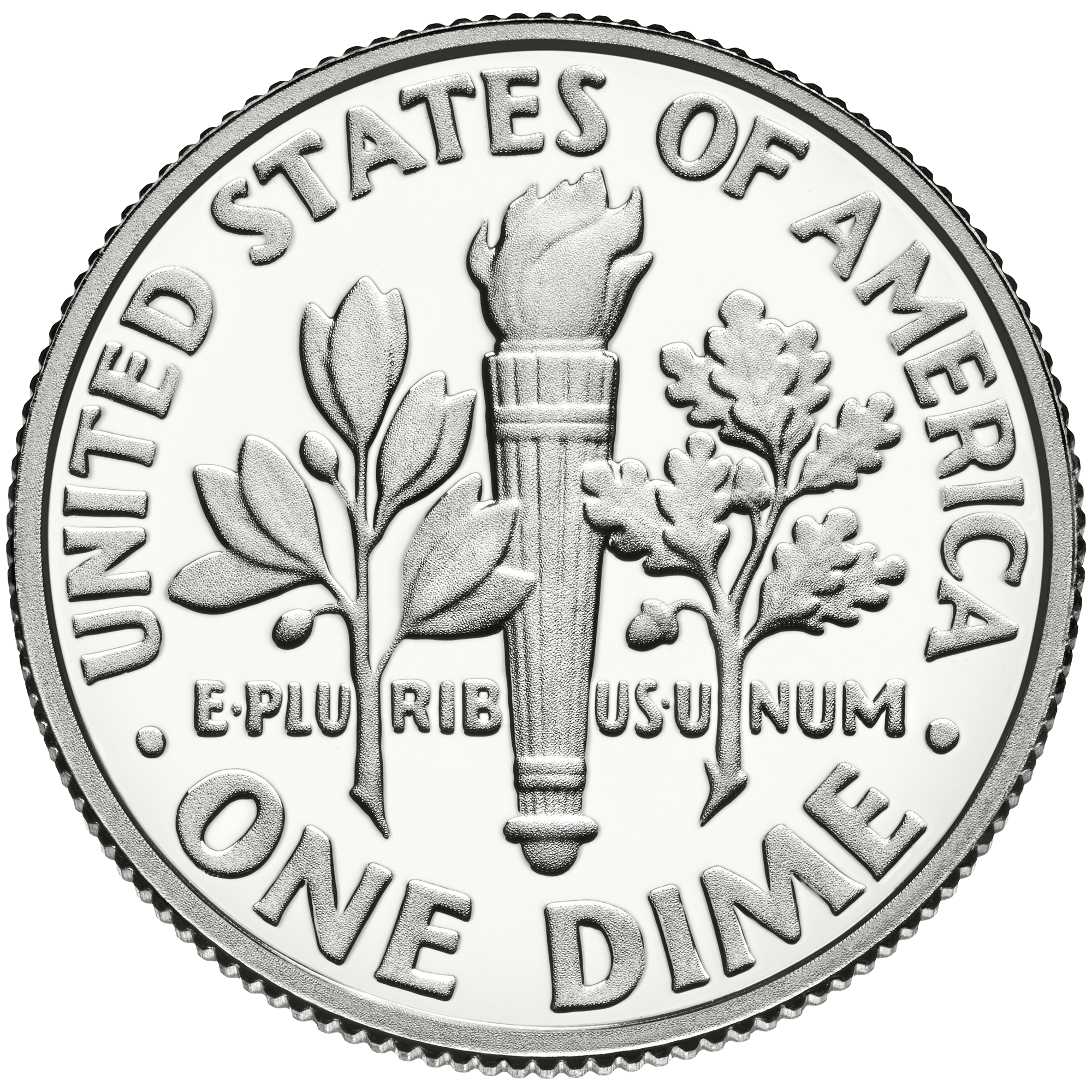
Sinnock's later Franklin half dollar reproduces the Liberty Bell from the commemorative half; his Roosevelt dime evokes the torch from the quarter eagle.

The first Sesquicentennial half dollar was coined by Philadelphia Mayor W. Freeland Kendrick at a special ceremony at that city's mint on May 19, 1926. It was presented to President Coolidge when he visited the Exposition and today rests in the Calvin Coolidge Presidential Library and Museum. Lewis, in a May 5 letter to Mint Director Grant, had indicated his (mistaken) understanding that a mark was placed on the first 1,000 coins struck to distinguish them and proposed that it be "K" for Kendrick; this was not done.

The Philadelphia Mint coined 1,000,528 of the half dollars at the behest of the Commission in May and June 1926, with the excess over the authorized mintage reserved for inspection and testing at the 1927 meeting of the United States Assay Commission. They also had the mint strike 200,226 quarter eagles in May and June, with the excess also set aside for the Assay Commission. The gold piece was the second quarter eagle to be a commemorative, after the Panama–Pacific issue of 1915. No further gold commemoratives, of any denomination, would be issued by the Mint Bureau until 1984, when a $10 piece was issued for the Los Angeles Olympics.

The Sesquicentennial Exposition opened in Philadelphia on June 1, 1926, financed in part by $5 million in bonds floated by the city. Work had not been completed on many of the exhibits and construction continued to the close of the fair. Nevertheless, there were many scientific, artistic, and commercial displays. Most firms that exhibited lost money by their participation, as did the city, and according to Bowers, "in the annals of fairs and expositions in the United States, the Sesquicentennial event earns a low rating."

Sales of coins at the Exposition were handled by the Commission; those by mail were dealt with by the Franklin Trust Company. The half dollar was priced at $1, and the quarter eagle at $4; however they did not sell well and the Commission's belief it could sell the entire mintage proved wildly optimistic. Although six million people visited the Exposition, 859,408 of the 1,000,000 half dollars were returned to the mint for melting. Similarly, 154,207 quarter eagles of the mintage of 200,000 were returned for melting. This did not take place all at once: 420,000 half dollars had been returned by January 1930, with the rest later. According to coin dealer B. Max Mehl in his 1937 volume on commemoratives, "Philadelphia with a population of over 2,000,000 people ... could and should have sold a greater number of coins". Arlie R. Slabaugh wrote in his 1975 book on the same subject, "we have been called complacent about our independence and the American way of life in recent years—judging by the sale of these coins, it must have been much worse in 1926!"

Sinnock reused the reverse for the Franklin half dollar, first struck in 1948, the year after his death. Mint and other publications gave credit for both coins' designs only to Sinnock until Don Taxay published his An Illustrated History of U.S. Commemorative Coinage in 1967, disclosing Lewis's involvement. Taxay referred to "the Mint's ... final, deliberate misattribution of the artist who designed the half dollar" and wrote, "perhaps after these forty years, it is time for a new credit line". Bowers noted, "Lewis and Sinnock should share the credit." R. S. Yeoman's A Guide Book of United States Coins (2015 edition) notes the involvement of both men, and values the half dollar at $90, with the quarter eagle beginning at around $450, though higher-graded coins may sell for more. Many specimens of both coins are known in circulated condition.

== See also ==
- United States Bicentennial coinage
- United States Semiquincentennial coinage

== References and bibliography ==
Books

- Bowers, Q. David (1992). Commemorative Coins of the United States: A Complete Encyclopedia. Wolfeboro, NH: Bowers and Merena Galleries, Inc.
- Flynn, Kevin (2008). The Authoritative Reference on Commemorative Coins 1892–1954. Roswell, GA: Kyle Vick. OCLC 711779330.
- Mehl, B. Max (1937). The Commemorative Coinage of the United States. Fort Worth, TX: B. Max Mehl.
- Slabaugh, Arlie R. (1975). United States Commemorative Coinage (second ed.). Racine, WI: Whitman Publishing (then a division of Western Publishing Company, Inc.). ISBN 978-0-307-09377-6.
- Swiatek, Anthony (2012). Encyclopedia of the Commemorative Coins of the United States. Chicago: KWS Publishers. ISBN 978-0-9817736-7-4.
- Swiatek, Anthony; Breen, Walter (1981). The Encyclopedia of United States Silver & Gold Commemorative Coins, 1892 to 1954. New York: Arco Publishing. ISBN 978-0-668-04765-4.
- Taxay, Don (1967). An Illustrated History of U.S. Commemorative Coinage. New York: Arco Publishing. ISBN 978-0-668-01536-3.
- Vermeule, Cornelius (1971). Numismatic Art in America. Cambridge, MA: The Belknap Press of Harvard University Press. ISBN 978-0-674-62840-3.
- Yeoman, R.S. (2014). Bressett, Kenneth (ed.). A Guide Book of United States Coins 2015 (68th ed.). Atlanta, Georgia: Whitman Publishing. ISBN 978-079484215-4. OCLC 875521690. OL 28306197M.
