= United States Semiquincentennial coinage =

2026 U.S. commemorative coins

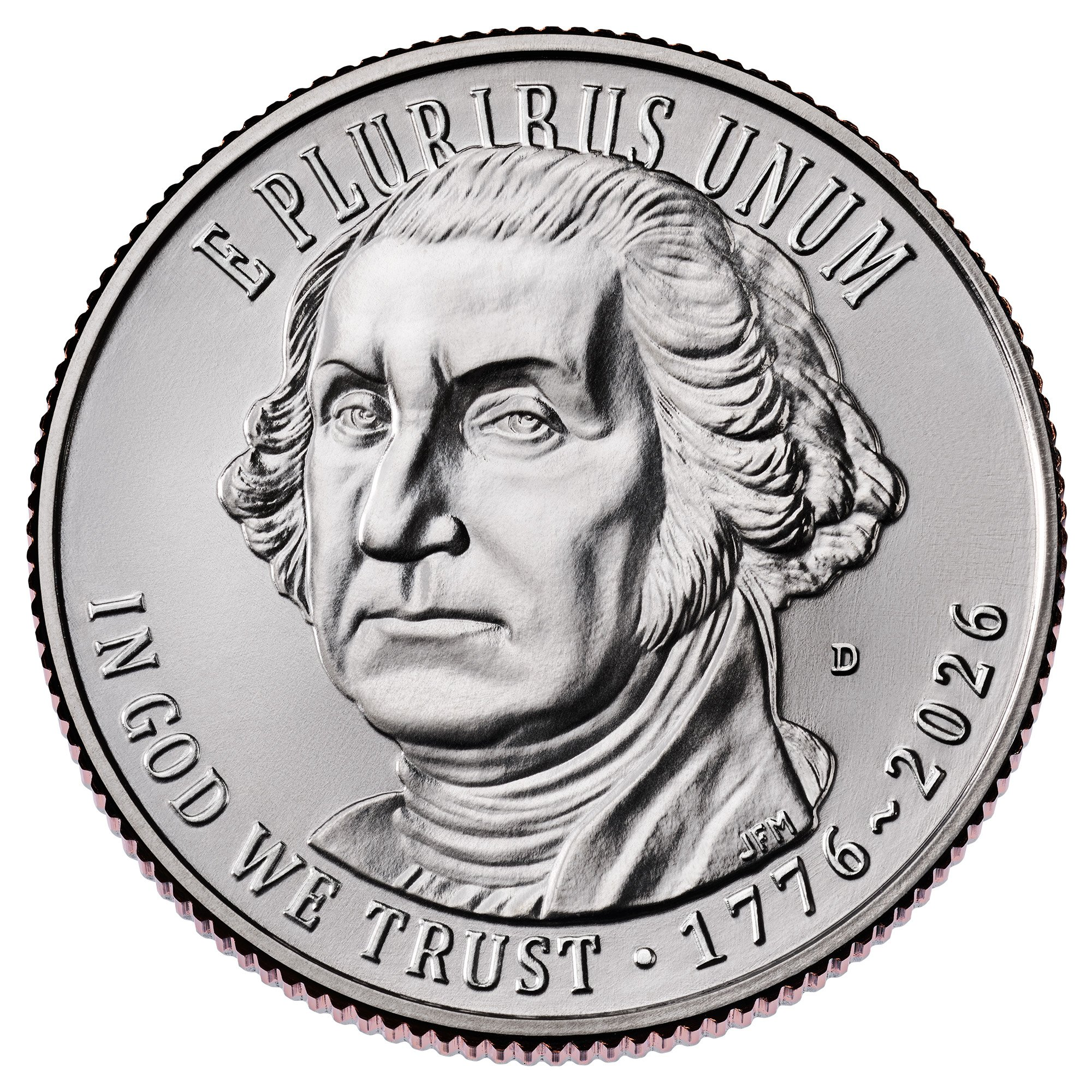
The Revolutionary War quarter depicts George Washington.

The United States Semiquincentennial coinage consists of the coins struck in 2026 in recognition of the 250th anniversary of American independence. It includes cents and nickels of the current series, a dime, five quarters, a half dollar and a one-dollar coin, with all but the cent and nickel bearing commemorative designs. Also being struck are special silver and gold pieces.

Mintage of new coins was authorized by the Circulating Collectible Coin Redesign Act of 2020, which also authorized the American Women Quarters Program and later planned circulating commemorative programs. The act received unanimous support from both the United States Senate and United States House of Representatives and was signed into law by President Donald Trump in 2021. The Biden administration worked with advisory committees to secure designs with a theme of movement towards a society deemed more inclusive. Thus, its officials sought themes commemorating the civil rights movement and women's suffrage. These, however, were changed following its departure from office in 2025.

The cent, which is not struck for circulation, is only available through sets sold by the United States Mint at a premium. A number of non-circulating legal tender issues have been struck, including reproductions of the 1804 dollar and the 1916 Mercury dime, Standing Liberty quarter and Walking Liberty half dollar. Some bullion coins, including the American Buffalo gold coin bear the dates 1776~2026 and a commemorative privy mark.

In October and December 2025, proposed designs featuring President Trump for the $1 coin were released. In July, Secretary of the Treasury Scott Bessent announced a final design depicting Trump, which was made available from the Mint on September 2. The plan had sparked controversy and debate over its legality. The issuance of the Trump dollar, which is both to be placed in circulation and sold to collectors, makes him the second U.S. president to appear on a coin during his lifetime, after Calvin Coolidge as part of the United States Sesquicentennial coinage in 1926. A version in gold with a $250 denomination is scheduled to be issued in November 2026.

== Preparation ==
During the first Trump administration, Congress passed the Circulating Collectible Coin Redesign Act of 2020, authorizing special designs for circulating coins between 2022 and 2030, including for the United States Semiquincentennial, to be celebrated in 2026 for the 250th anniversary of American independence. The act, which had been introduced as a bill by Representative Barbara Lee, Democrat of California, on March 27, 2020, authorized a redesign of the six denominations of circulating coins for the Semiquincentennial, including five quarter dollars. The coins were required to be symbolic of the Semiquincentennial, and one of the quarters was to show the contributions of women.

The designs were to be selected by the United States Secretary of the Treasury after consultation with the Commission of Fine Arts (CFA) and review by the Citizens Coinage Advisory Committee (CCAC). The CFA is authorized to opine on public artworks, including coinage. The CCAC advises the Treasury Secretary, who makes the final decisions on coinage designs, on matters relating to coinage and medals. During the Biden administration, the Mint worked with the CCAC to develop designs and themes for the Semiquincentennial symbolizing movement towards an America deemed more inclusive.

In 2023, the Mint conducted a public survey seeking views on the themes that had been developed, and on how the Founding Fathers and personifications such as Liberty should be depicted. Over a multiyear period, the CCAC consulted historians, political appointees of both major parties, the National Park Service, the Smithsonian and others. It decided the themes for the five quarters should be the Declaration of Independence, the Constitution, abolition, suffrage and civil rights.

== Initial design recommendations ==
The CFA and CCAC both reviewed proposed designs for the cent and nickel in February 2024. For production reasons, the Mint did not propose a full redesign for either coin, but merely noting the anniversary with a dual date. Both committees supported the use of the dual date "1776~2026". There was some support on each committee for the use of a privy mark of the numbers "250" superimposed on the Liberty Bell.

Thirteen candidate designs for the dime's obverse and eight for the reverse were reviewed by the CCAC and CFA in October 2024, with one depicting Liberty as an African American favored by the CFA and the CCAC choosing one depicting Liberty wearing a Liberty cap. Both committees agreed on elements of the design. The reverse designs chosen by both groups depicted an eagle in flight carrying arrows, with the theme of the dime to be Liberty over Tyranny.

Both CFA and CCAC met in October 2024 to recommend designs for the five quarters. For the Declaration quarter, both groups proposed the same designs: an obverse showing Liberty nurturing a "spark of enlightenment" with a reverse depicting the Liberty Bell, complete with crack, swinging and tolling.

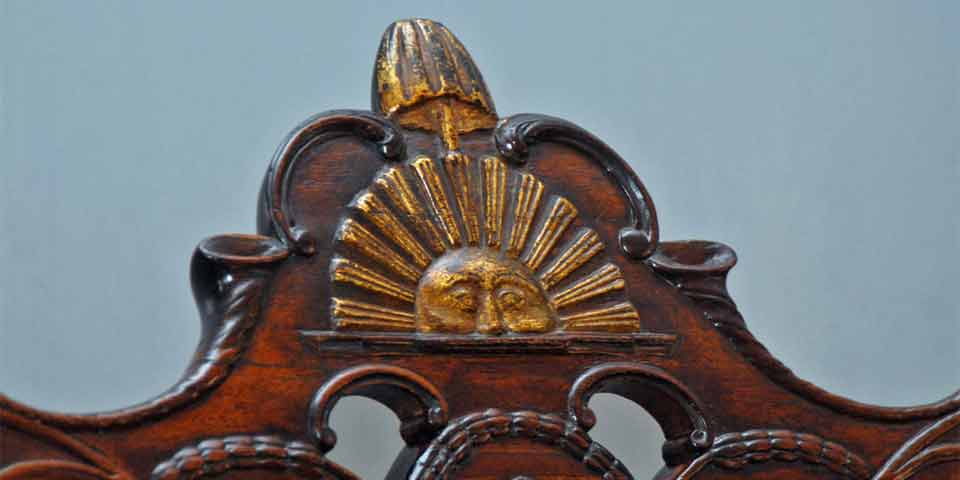
A detail from the chair in which George Washington presided over the U.S. Constitutional Convention

Both groups agreed on an obverse for the Constitution quarter depicting Liberty striding forward with a torch in one hand and a rolled document, representing the Constitution, in the other. They differed on the reverse, with the CFA recommending a design featuring a detail from the chair George Washington sat in as president of the Constitutional Convention, depicting the Sun. The CCAC felt the public would not identify the CFA's favorite, and suggested a design featuring part of Independence Hall, where the convention met. For the Abolitionism quarter, both groups favored the same portrait of Frederick Douglass while choosing different designs showing the breaking of chains.

The Suffrage quarter favored by the CCAC depicts a woman, striding to the left while carrying a banner, Votes for Women. Members chose a reverse featuring a Votes for Women rosette like those often worn by suffragists, though they asked that Mint artists replace the slogan to avoid duplicating it. CFA members recommended the same obverse while favoring a reverse showing a child's hand joining others to uplift a stone foundation inscribed with "Liberty Equality Justice for Women SUFFRAGE". The same Civil Rights quarter design for the obverse was recommended by both groups, showing an African American girl, intended to be Ruby Bridges, facing right and carrying her schoolbooks. On the reverse, different concepts, both featuring people with arms linked and the legend "We Shall Overcome" were chosen by the two groups.

The half dollar design selected by both groups featured the Statue of Liberty on the obverse, with her torch being passed from one generation to the next on the reverse.

This advice was transmitted to the Secretary of the Treasury (under Biden, Janet Yellen), for a final decision. According to an unnamed source cited in The Wall Street Journal, Yellen approved designs for the Semiquincentennial coinage before leaving office in January 2025, but no final announcement was made nor were final designs released. Scott Bessent, appointed by President Trump as Treasury Secretary, made final design choices that differed from those recommended by the CCAC and CFA.

== Announcement of designs ==
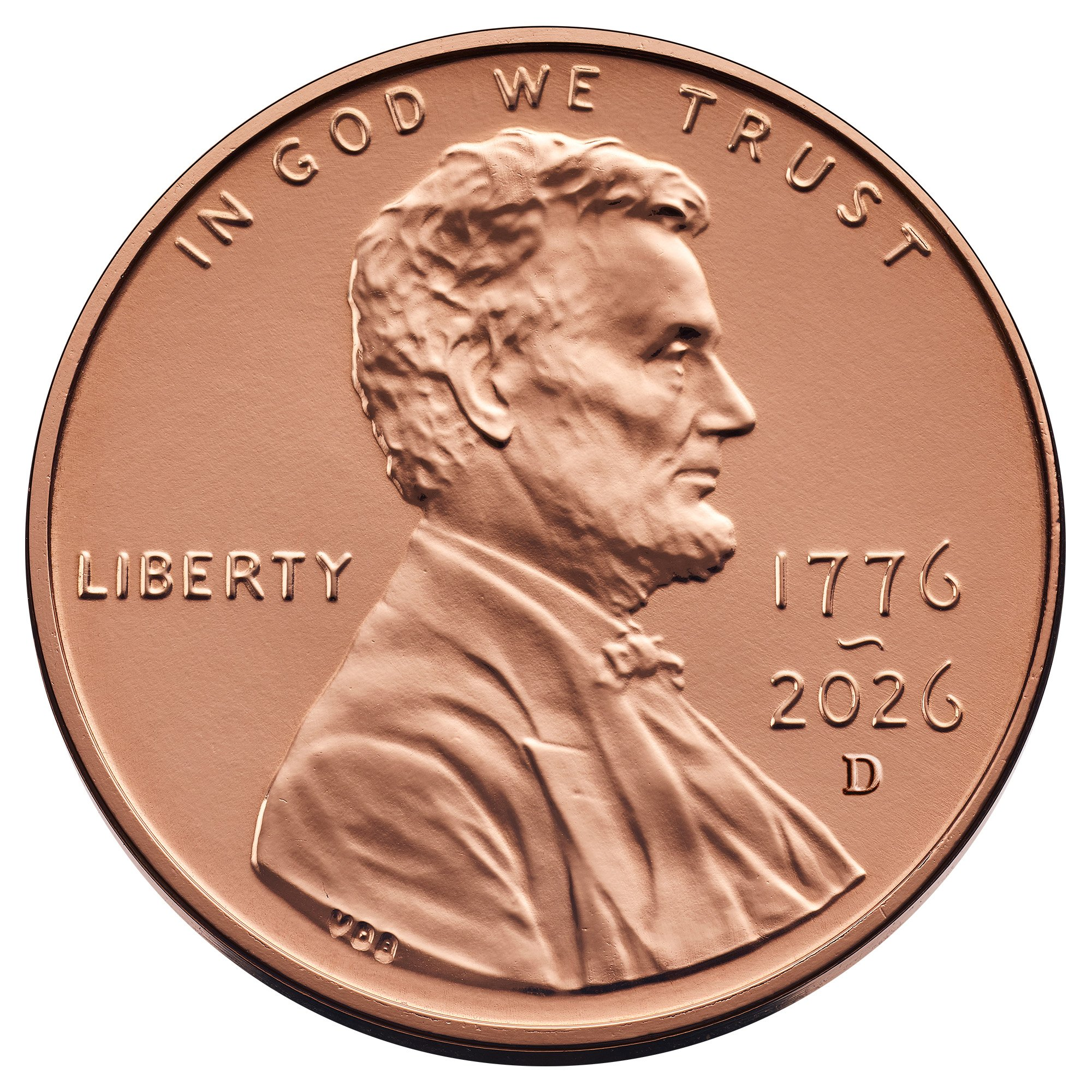
Obverse of the 1776~2026 cent (Denver Mint issue shown)

On December 10, 2025, the Mint announced designs for the 1776~2026 coinage at the National Constitution Center in Philadelphia. With the striking of circulation cents halted in November 2025, the 1776~2026 cent is not being struck for use in commerce, but only for collectors.

The CCAC was not called upon to review additional designs before the announcement. No member of the CCAC attended the announcement, and the longest-serving member as of then, Donald Scarinci, deemed it "another sad day for America", because coin designs not reviewed by the committee had been approved for the first time since its establishment in 2003.

=== Designs ===
The cent and nickel, as recommended by the CCAC and CFA, were unchanged but for the dual dating. The dime's obverse was a head of Liberty wearing a Liberty cap, with a reverse featuring an eagle. The half dollar depicts the Statue of Liberty, and on its reverse its torch being passed.

One quarter honored the Mayflower Compact, in which each individual agreed to submit to the will of the majority. It featured a man and a woman of the Pilgrims embracing on the obverse, with the reverse depicting the Mayflower. A second marked the American Revolutionary War, with the American commander in chief, George Washington, on the obverse and a Revolutionary War soldier depicted at Valley Forge on the other side. A quarter for the United States Declaration of Independence depicted its author, Thomas Jefferson on the obverse, with the Liberty Bell tolling on the reverse. The United States Constitution quarter design depicts James Madison, deemed its father, on the obverse, and the steeple of Independence Hall, its clocks showing the time 2:50, on the other. The Gettysburg Address quarter design shows Abraham Lincoln, who wrote and delivered the speech, backed with a design showing two hands grasping each other and a quotation from the Gettysburg Address, "a new nation conceived in liberty". The change in themes meant that the Votes for Women designs and those featuring Bridges and Douglass were abandoned.

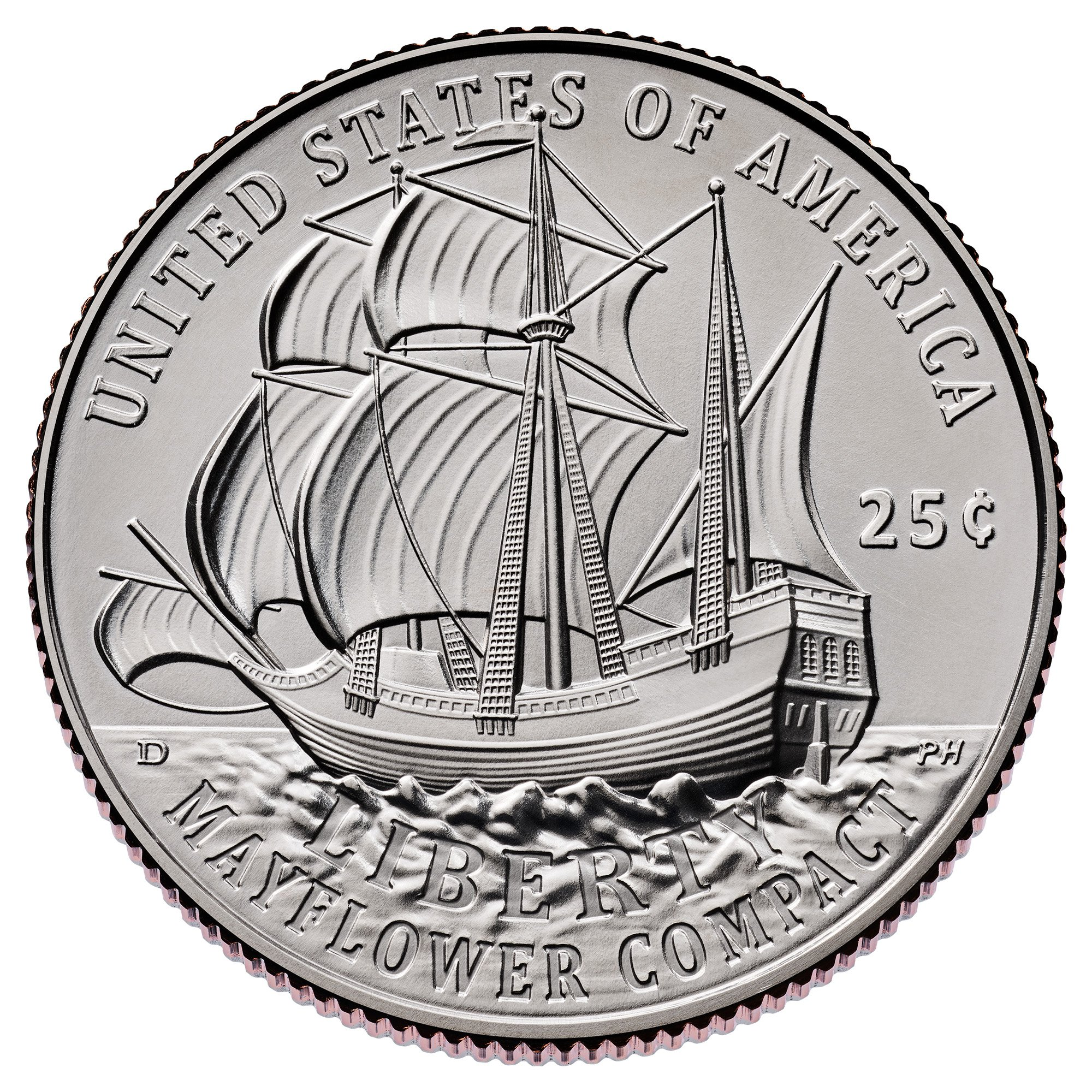
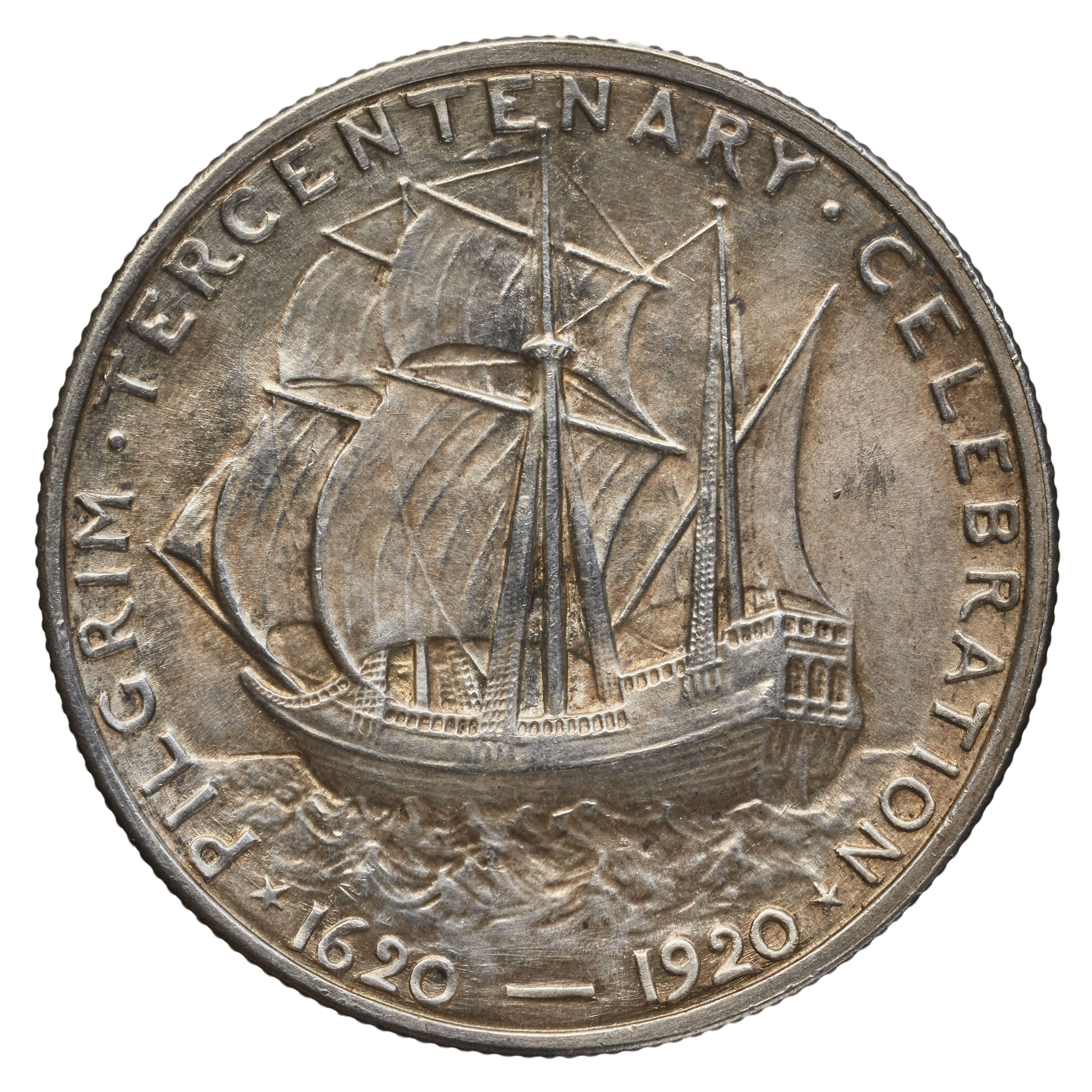
The Mayflower Compact quarter reverse (left) was based on the Pilgrim Tercentenary half dollar reverse (right)

Several of the quarter designs were taken from or inspired by previous Mint releases. The reverse of the Mayflower Compact quarter was based on the reverse of the Pilgrim Tercentenary half dollar, which was issued in 1920 and 1921. The portrait of Washington on the obverse of the Revolutionary War quarter and the portrait of Madison on the obverse of the Constitution quarter were taken from their respective 2007 Presidential dollar coins. The portrait of Jefferson on the Declaration of Independence quarter was taken from an Indian peace medal designed by early Mint engravers Robert Scot and John Reich.

=== Reaction ===
Acting Mint director Kristie McNally stated of the December 2025 designs, "the designs on these historic coins depict the story of America’s journey toward a 'more perfect union', and celebrate America’s defining ideals of liberty," According to the Mint, the replacement designs celebrate "American history and the birth of our great nation". United States Treasurer Brandon Beach stated of the design change, "while the Biden administration and Secretary Yellen remained focused on DEI and critical race theory policies, the Trump administration is dedicated to fostering prosperity and patriotism." Catherine Cortez Masto, a Democratic senator from Nevada, regretted the abandonment of the Biden-era designs. "Those designs represented 'continued progress toward 'a more perfect union'. ... The American story didn’t stop at the pilgrims and founding fathers."

The original coin designs, according to Canadian Coin News, "would have gone much further in foregrounding social-justice milestones", and their abandonment provoked debate among coin collectors, officials and the general public. Newsweek called the change, "the latest example of the Trump administration’s broader effort to reshape how American history is officially depicted". The New York Times titled its article on the announcement, "The war on 'wokeness' comes to the U.S. Mint." Quartz suggested that the replacement of the recommended designs, "amounts to a Whiter interpretation of American history over 250 years".

Patrick A. Heller of Numismatic News expressed surprise that the presence of a woman as one of two figures on the obverse of the Mayflower Compact quarter was used to fulfill the statutory requirement that one of the quarters denote the contributions of a woman or women, as only adult men not in servitude drafted and signed the Mayflower Compact.

== Trump dollar ==
=== Development and controversy ===
The controversial dollar coins featuring President Donald Trump

Under the authorizing legislation signed into law in 2021, the Treasury Secretary is allowed to issue a Semiquincentennial one-dollar piece in 2026 only. On October 3, 2025, the Treasury Department issued design concepts for possible use on the $1 coin. These featured President Donald Trump in profile on the obverse, and on the reverse Trump standing with raised fist and the U.S. flag in the background, with the words Fight! Fight! Fight!, evoking his words and actions during the July 2024 assassination attempt on him. The authenticity of the designs was confirmed by U.S. Treasurer Beach.

Under the authorizing legislation, a head-and-bust image of any person, living or dead, or any depiction of a living person, was not to be used on the reverse of the coins. No such restriction applies to the obverse. Although only tradition forbids a living person from appearing on a U.S. coin, it has rarely happened. President Calvin Coolidge appeared on the 1926 Sesquicentennial half dollar, and, more recently, Eunice Kennedy Shriver appeared on the 1995 Special Olympics silver dollar. An 1866 law forbids placing a living person on U.S. paper currency, following the controversial appearance of National Currency Bureau superintendent Spencer M. Clark on the five-cent fractional currency note.

Richard Blumenthal of Connecticut, a Democratic senator, stated that Trump "has no right to put his image on the US currency just by fiat". Democratic senators introduced a bill intended to block a Trump dollar, to which Beach responded that Democrats were "so triggered by the proposed coin celebrating our nation’s 250th anniversary that they are trying to recklessly change law to block it." Beach, an advocate of a Trump coin, added, "The American people deserve a commemorative coin celebrating our great nation."

Some members of the CCAC took the position that a Trump dollar violated the spirit of laws restricting where images of living people, including presidents, could appear on the coinage, though it had voted in favor of the image of Ruby Bridges, a living person, appearing on the quarter. Treasury Secretary Bessent stated on social media, "there is no profile more emblematic for the front of this coin than that of our serving President, Donald J. Trump."

=== Approval and production ===
Paul Hollis, nominated by Trump to be the Director of the Mint, appeared at confirmation hearings on October 30, 2025, and was questioned by Chris Van Hollen, Democratic senator from Maryland, about the legality of a Trump dollar. Hollis told Van Hollen he would consult the proper legal authorities. On December 18, Hollis was confirmed by the Senate. When other Semiquincentennial designs were announced in December 2025, no statement was made regarding the dollar coin, and government sources declined to comment when asked if it were still planned for President Trump to appear on it. Nevertheless, the Mint posted on its website candidate designs for the dollar coin, with all obverses depicting Trump.

On October 27, 2025, President Trump dismissed all members of the CFA. Every CFA member then serving had been appointed by the previous president, Joe Biden, who had, in 2021, dismissed the members of the CFA appointed by Trump during his first term as president. Trump appointed new members to the CFA, who were sworn in on January 22, 2026. At the CFA meeting that day, the commission recommended candidate designs for the dollar coin, showing Trump in profile on the obverse and an eagle from the Great Seal of the United States on the reverse. Megan Sullivan, acting head of the Mint’s Office of Design Management, said legal research by the Mint and Treasury had affirmed the legality of the Trump dollar under the authorizing legislation.

The Mint added the Trump dollar to the CCAC's agenda for its planned meeting at the end of 2025, as well as a gold coin depicting Trump to the February 24, 2026, CCAC agenda. Both were removed by the chair of the CCAC on behalf of a majority of the membership, and the late-2025 meeting was not held; none was held in January 2026 despite there being coinage designs from multiple programs for the CCAC to review. The Mint took the position that a majority of the CCAC had chosen not to review the Trump dollar, and did not seek to have it considered at the February 24 meeting. The coin is in a gold-colored base metal alloy, like the Sacagawea dollar. According to Coin News, the design moved forward to the standard review and approval processes within the Treasury Department. Scarinci, by then the CCAC chair, disputed that the CCAC had waived its chance to review the coins and said they would be illegal unless reviewed by the CCAC, but also that the committee would not review them because it was against putting living presidents on coins.

In March 2026, The New York Times reported that prototypes had been struck both of the $1 coin and of a $250 coin containing an ounce of gold, both to depict Trump, and Secretary Bessent had given preliminary approval. Bessent announced the final design of the $1 coin in July 2026, for issuance later in the year. The obverse, based on one of the earlier three designs, shows Trump in a suit and tie, facing almost forward, by the Mint's chief engraver, Joseph Menna. The reverse, credited to the late chief engraver Frank Gasparro depicts the Great Seal of the United States. The coins are struck at Philadelphia without mint mark, and in addition to sales in rolls and bags to collectors, will be placed in circulation.

=== Release and collecting ===
On September 2, 2026, the coins were made available from the Mint. A total of 250,000 of the Trump dollars were struck on July 4 and bear a "JULY 4th" privy mark. These were mixed among the coins sold in bags and rolls, with the total authorized mintage for the coins sold in bags and rolls at 8,750,000. The rolls of Trump dollars and the bags sold out within hours, and were the Mint's top two products in terms of sales for the week of their release. A gold version struck at West Point, with a $250 denomination, is scheduled for release on November 19, as are thousand-coin bags of the base metal Trump dollar.

== Production and release ==
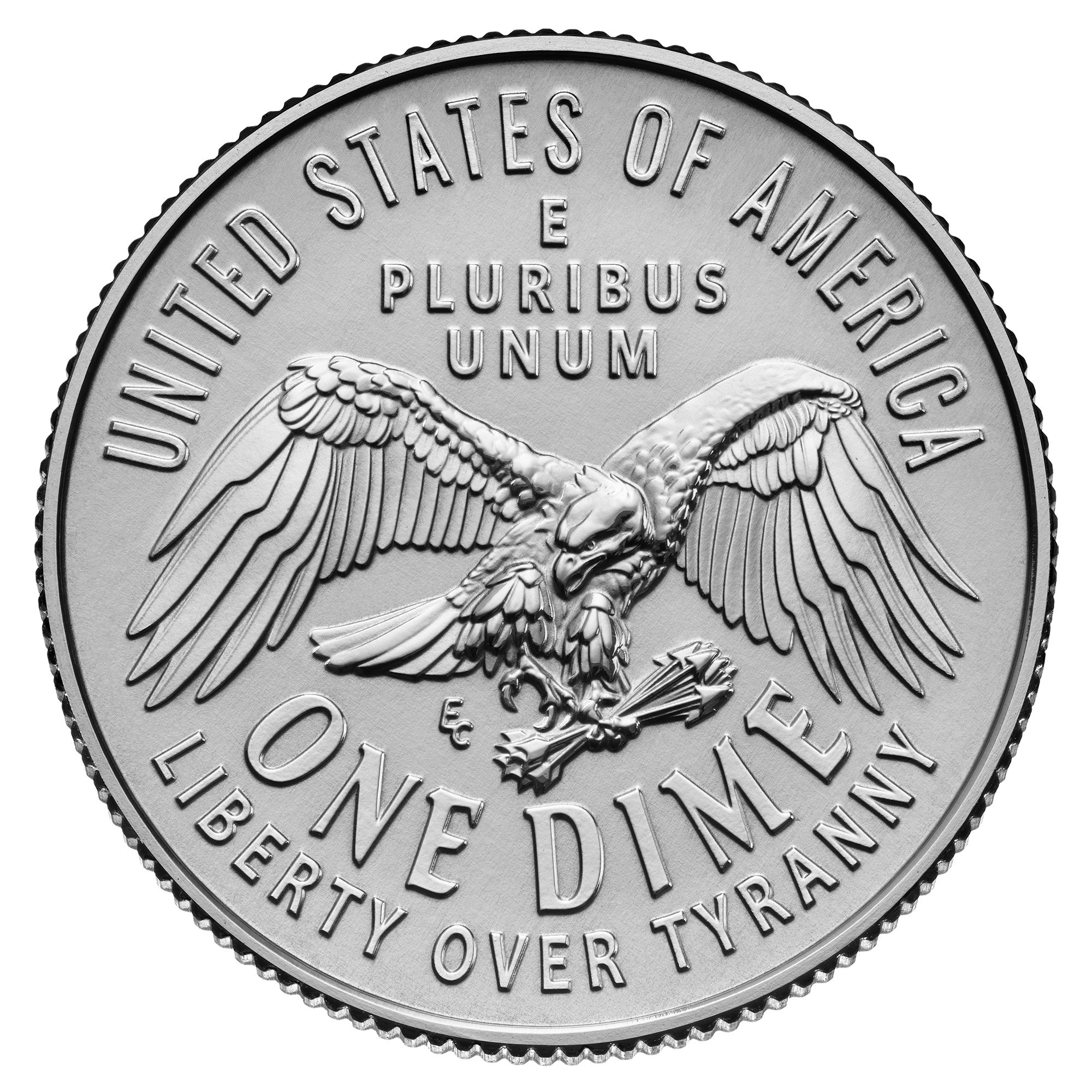
Reverse of the 1776~2026 dime, featuring an eagle carrying 13 arrows

Production of the 1776~2026 quarters began with the striking of 78.2 million Mayflower Compact quarters and one million Revolutionary War quarters in December 2025, with 48.8 million of the Mayflower coins and all of the Revolutionary coins struck at the Denver Mint and the remainder, all Revolutionary War quarters, struck at the Philadelphia Mint. The Mint announced the release of the Mayflower Compact quarter into circulation on January 5, 2026. Also being released for circulation then were the dime and half dollar. When the Mayflower Compact quarters in rolls and in bags were placed on sale on the Mint's web site on February 5, 2026, they became unavailable within minutes but still were the first-, third- and fourth-best selling numismatic items of the week at the Mint.

In February, the Mint published images of the year's proof set and silver proof set, both at substantial price increases from the previous year. The silver proof set includes the 1776~2026 cent, struck with an S mint mark, as does the proof set, for released later in the year. Both sets include a Native American dollar for 2026. According to Coin News, subscriptions which would entitle the holder to purchase each set showed as not available on the Mint's website.

In March 2026, there were some comments on the eagle on the reverse of the dime, which carries 13 arrows, but not, as on the Great Seal of the United States, an olive branch. In February 2026, the designer, Eric David Custer, stated that the design was a remembrance of the Americans at the time of the Revolutionary War, who were still waiting for peace. The design with the arrows was reviewed and recommended by the CCAC in July 2024, before Trump won election to a second term.

The Revolutionary War quarter entered circulation on March 23, 2026, with a launch event at Washington's home, Mount Vernon. When released as a Mint product four days later, the rolls and bags sold out almost immediately, and were the three top-selling products for the Mint that week. The same week, the Mayflower Compact coins returned to sale and were the fourth through sixth best-selling products of the week, as the Mint exceeded originally stated product limits. Placed on sale in rolls and bags at a premium on April 17, the Emerging Liberty dime sold out within minutes, becoming the week's top seller for the Mint.

On May 15, 2026, the Mint sent a 1776~2026 nickel, a dime, a half dollar and the set of five quarters into space on a SpaceX Falcon 9 to the International Space Station. The coins were part of the payload of NASA's 34th SpaceX Commercial Resupply Services mission (SpaceX CRS-34). Mint Director Hollis attended the launch of the uncrewed craft.

The Declaration of Independence quarter entered circulation on May 25, 2026. On June 23, Hollis announced that 250,000 Declaration quarters bearing no mint mark but with a July 4 privy mark, would be hidden among the Declaration quarters shipped to banks for the public to find. The Mint further announced, on July 7, that it had struck on July 4 a total of 250 coins bearing the Declaration design and July 4 privy mark containing 2.5 troy ounces of silver. The coins are plain edged, and sequentially numbered from 1 to 250, and are to be sold at auction.

The silver proof set went on sale on June 11. This included the dime, quarters and half dollar in silver, plus a Native American dollar, nickel and the first 1776~2026 cent, with all coins bearing a S mint mark. After several days, it was selling on eBay at a premium. The uncirculated sets went on sale on June 30, containing coins from Philadelphia and Denver, including the only cents from those mints. A total of 300,000 was to be issued; they sold out in about 24 hours.

In August, the Mint presented 2,983 half dollars to the National 9/11 Memorial and Museum. These were struck at the West Point Mint, one for every person listed on the memorial, and bear a commemorative privy mark. The following month, the Mint announced that 250,000 examples of the 1776~2026–W half dollar with that privy mark would be released into circulation. Also in September, the Mint announced the sale of more half dollars with a different privy mark marking 9/11 and struck at Philadelphia. On October 19, 2026, the Gettysburg Address quarter entered circulation.

== Best of the Mint reproductions; other issues ==
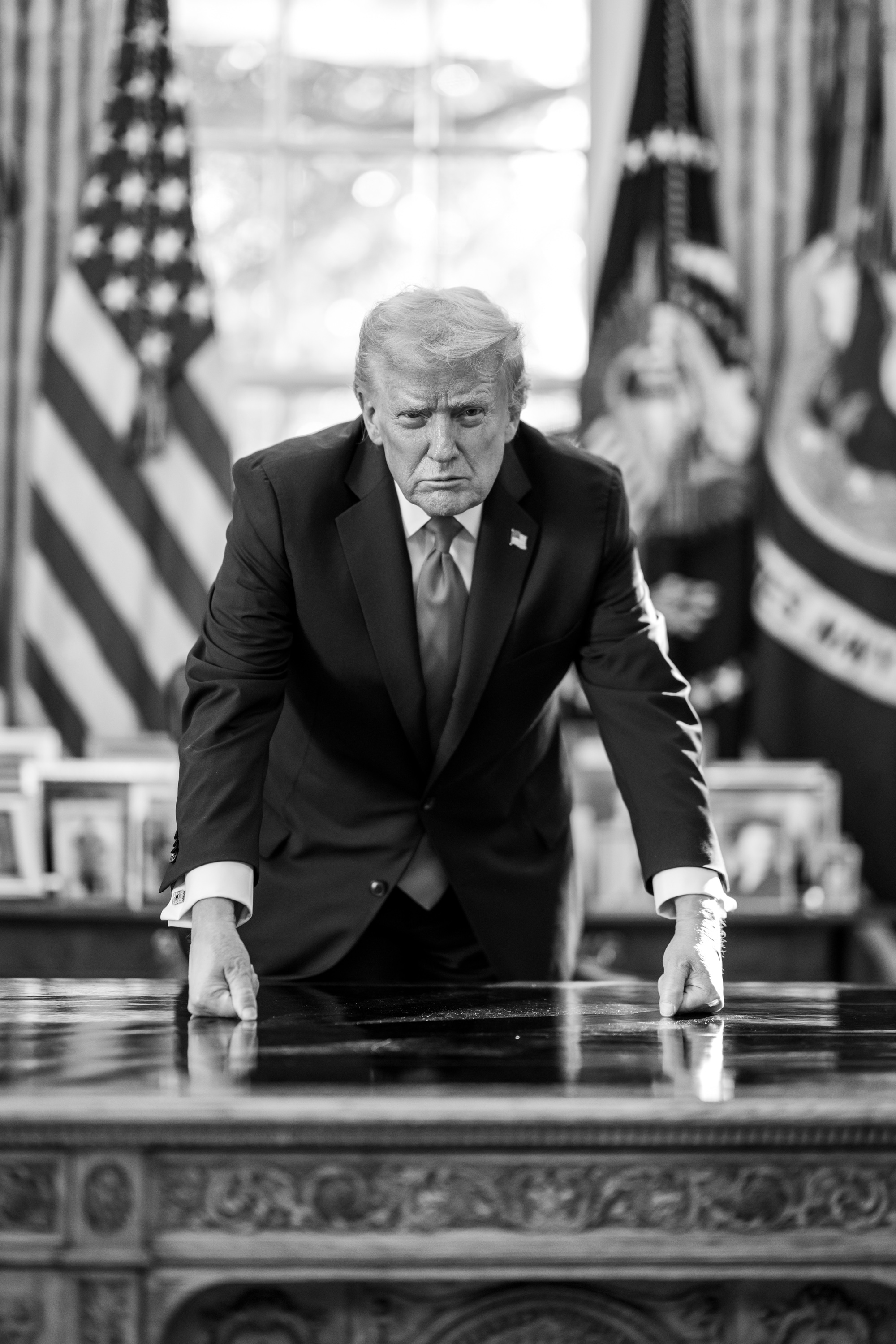
Photograph of Trump by Daniel Torok on which the commemorative dollar coin is based

In February 2024, the Mint announced plans, based on public surveys, to issue one-ounce and fractional ounce reproductions of classic coin issues during 2026, known as the "Best of the Mint" program. It announced five candidates, which gained immediate support from the CCAC: the 1916 Mercury dime, Standing Liberty quarter and Walking Liberty half dollar, the 1907 Saint-Gaudens double eagle in high relief, and the 1804 dollar. Each would be struck in gold, bear the Liberty Bell/250 privy mark and be accompanied by a silver medal of modern design inspired by the coin in question.

The American Silver Eagle coins were struck with the privy mark and dual dating, excepting the pieces at the Philadelphia Mint for the Congratulations Set, which carry only the 2026 date and no privy mark. The American Gold Eagle similarly features dual dating and a privy mark.

Pieces such as the Morgan and Peace dollar issues, and the American Buffalo gold coins struck during 2026 also bear the 1776~2026 double date and privy mark.

On March 19, 2026, the CFA approved a design for a gold coin commemorating the semiquincentennial, showing Trump leaning over his desk. This issue would be in addition to the proposed Trump dollar coin, not part of the issues authorized by the 2021 act, and no law forbids it. The design is based on a photograph of Trump by Daniel Torok that was placed in the Smithsonian National Portrait Gallery. Commission member Chamberlain Harris stated, "It's a very strong and very tough image of him, and I think it's fitting to have a current sitting president who's presiding over the country over the 250th year on a commemorative coin for said year." Members were told by Sullivan that Trump had personally approved the proposed coin's design, and they urged her to make the coin as large as possible to match his preference for bigness. In May, the Mint disclosed that up to 47 such coins would be issued, at some point after July 4, 2026, and each would contain about $90,000 worth of gold.

In June 2026, the Mint announced that 2,026 $250 pieces, shaped like the Liberty Bell and each containing one troy ounce of gold, would be struck, along with the same number of half-ounce $125 coins and one-half ounce silver medals with the same shape. The $250 is priced at $19,000, the $125 at $10,050 and the silver medal at $750, to go on sale July 16.

== Circulating coinage ==
Coin	Subject	Obverse	Reverse	Artist(s)		Release date	Mintage				
Coin	Subject	Obverse	Reverse	Sculptor	Designer	Release date	Denver	Philadelphia	San Francisco	West Point	Total
Dime	Liberty over Tyranny	Liberty	Eagle clutching arrows	Eric David Custer	Esao Andrews (obverse); Eric David Custer (reverse)	January 5, 2026					
Quarter	Mayflower Compact	Two Pilgrims	the Mayflower	Eric David Custer (obverse); Phebe Hemphill (reverse)	Roland D. Sanders (obverse); Cyrus E. Dallin (reverse)	January 5, 2026	121,400,000	115,200,000			
Quarter	American Revolutionary War	George Washington	Continental Army soldier overlooking Valley Forge	Joseph Menna (obverse); Craig Campbell (reverse)	Joseph Menna (obverse); Donna Weaver (reverse)	March 23, 2026	101,400,000	100,400,000			
Quarter	United States Declaration of Independence	Thomas Jefferson	Liberty Bell	Benjamin Sowards (reverse)	John McGraw (reverse)	May 25, 2026	126,600,000	69,600,000			
Quarter	Constitution of the United States	James Madison	Independence Hall	Don Everhart (obverse); Phebe Hemphilll (reverse)	Joel Iskowitz (obverse); Donna Weaver (reverse)	August 10, 2026					
Quarter	Gettysburg Address	Abraham Lincoln	Two hands grasping each other	Don Everhart (obverse); Craig Campbell (reverse)	Justin Kunz (obverse); Beth Zaiken (reverse)	October 19, 2026					
Half dollar	Enduring Liberty	Statue of Liberty	Hands passing Liberty's torch	John McGraw (obverse); Darla Jackson (reverse)	Donna Weaver (obverse); Beth Zaiken (reverse)	January 5, 2026					
Dollar	President Donald J. Trump	U.S. President Donald J. Trump	Great Seal of the United States		Joseph Menna (obverse); Frank Gasparro (reverse)	September 2, 2026					

250,000 Declaration of Independence quarters struck with "JULY 4th" privy mark and without mint mark, plus 250 more struck in silver and containing 2.5 ounces of silver. The silver pieces were struck at Philadelphia. 1776–2026–W half dollars were struck with a privy mark for 9/11, with an additional amount from Philadelphia struck with another 9/11 privy mark. Additionally, 250,000 of the original batch of 9 million $1 coins featuring President Donald J. Trump on the obverse that were struck on July 4, 2026 were also struck with a "JULY 4th" privy mark. They were randomly included in the 25-coin rolls and 100-coin bags available on the US Mint website on September 2, 2026.

== Non-circulating coinage ==
Coin	Subject	Obverse	Reverse	Artist(s)		Release date	Mintage				
Coin	Subject	Obverse	Reverse	Sculptor	Designer	Release date	Denver	Philadelphia	San Francisco	West Point	Total
1916 Mercury dime		Liberty, with winged cap	Olive branch, fasces		Adolph Weinman	June 4, 2026				30,000	30,000
1916 Standing Liberty quarter		Liberty	Eagle in flight		Hermon MacNeil	July 10, 2026					
1916 Walking Liberty half dollar		Liberty astride	Eagle		Adolph Weinman	August 6, 2026					
1907 Saint-Gaudens double eagle		Liberty	Eagle in flight		Augustus Saint-Gaudens	September 24, 2026					
1804 dollar		Liberty	Heraldic eagle		Unknown	August 27, 2026					
$125 Liberty Bell (half ounce)		Liberty Bell	Independence Hall		Matt Newell	July 16, 2026		2,026			2,026
$250 Liberty Bell (one ounce)		Liberty Bell	Independence Hall		Matt Newell	July 16, 2026		2,026			2,026
$250 (President Donald J. Trump)	President Donald J. Trump	Bust of President Trump	Great Seal of the United States		Joseph Menna (obverse); Frank Gasparro (reverse)	November 19, 2026					

== See also ==
- United States Sesquicentennial coinage (1926)
- United States Bicentennial coinage (1776–1976)
- United States two-hundred-fifty dollar bill
