= United States two-hundred-fifty dollar bill =

Two-hundred-fifty dollars
- Country: United States
- Value: $250

Obverse
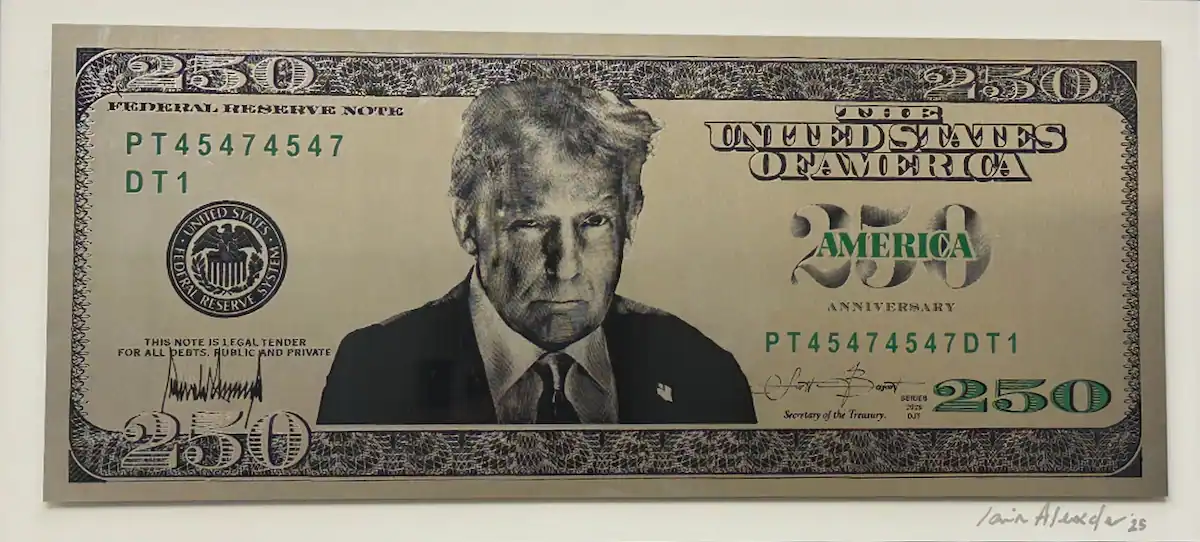
- Design: Donald Trump

The United States 250-dollar bill (US$250) is a proposed denomination of the United States dollar.

== History ==
In February 2025, Republican Rep. Joe Wilson announced on X that he was drafting legislation to move forward with a proposal to establish a $250 bill, alongside a design mock-up. Wilson's bill would direct the Bureau of Engraving and Printing (BEP) to design a $250 bill featuring President Donald Trump. Under current federal law, due to the 1866 "Thayer Amendment" (31 U.S. Code § 5114), only deceased individuals may appear on U.S. currency and securities. Wilson's bill would amend the law, adding "except if the individual is or has been the President of the United States." H.R. 1761 was introduced into the 119th United States Congress on February 27, 2025.

On September 26, 2025, Republican Rep. Andy Barr released an op-ed, in which he expressed support for creating a $250 bill, to celebrate the U.S. Semiquincentennial; Barr also noted that September 26 also marked Trump's 250th day in office, during his second term. Barr announced that he would be supporting legislation from Wilson, titled the Donald J. Trump $250 Bill Act, to commemorate both.

On May 28, 2026, the U.S. Department of the Treasury confirmed that it was taking steps toward the creation of the $250 bill. The Washington Post reported that U.S. Treasurer Brandon Beach was pushing to expedite the creation of the proposed bill. Beach reportedly provided the BEP with a design created by British artist Iain Alexander, featuring Trump's portrait, a 250th anniversary logo, and Trump's signature. Following the report, the Treasury confirmed that Trump's signature appeared on the proposed design, and that Beach "never asked staff to print the $250 note before congressional action occurs".

That day, U.S. Secretary of the Treasury Scott Bessent told journalist Kaitlan Collins during a press briefing that he didn't find "anything untoward" about featuring Trump on a commemorative bill, while adding that it was ultimately "up to" Congress if Wilson's bill became law. He defended internal design mock-ups, stating "we prepare for everything if it gets passed, just like we were ready six months in advance for the One Big Beautiful Bill for tax guidance." Bessent also criticized The Washington Post's article, describing it as "Terribly written, terribly edited."

The proposed bill caused amusement in China where the number 250 (二百五, pinyin èr bái wǔ; zhuyin ㄦˋ ㄅㄞˇ ㄨˇ) is slang for "idiot".

=== Current status ===
As of June 2026, the $250 bill is not an approved denomination for U.S. currency, as the Secretary of the Treasury does not have sole authority to create new denominations (other than in platinum coins) and the Thayer Amendment would prohibit placing a portrait of a living person on it. For the U.S. Department of the Treasury to officially establish a new denomination of US currency, Congress must first pass a law authorizing it.

== See also ==
- Spencer M. Clark
- United States Semiquincentennial coinage
