= Lynchburg Sesquicentennial half dollar =

US coin worth 50 cents

- United States
- Value: 50 cents (0.50) US dollars)
- Mass: 12.5 g
- Diameter: 30.61 mm (1.20 in)
- Thickness: 2.15 mm (0.08 in)
- Edge: Reeded
- Composition: 90.0% silver; 10.0% copper
- Silver: 0.36169 troy oz
- Years of minting: 1936
- Mintage: 20,000 with 13 pieces for the Assay Commission
- Mint marks: None, all pieces struck at the Philadelphia Mint without mint mark

Obverse
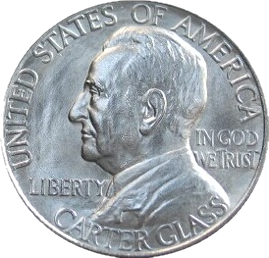
- Design: Bust of Carter Glass
- Designer: Charles Keck
- Design date: 1936

Reverse
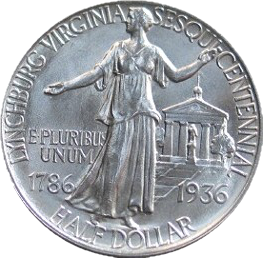
- Design: Liberty
- Designer: Charles Keck
- Design date: 1936

The Lynchburg Sesquicentennial half dollar was a commemorative half dollar designed by Charles Keck and struck by the United States Bureau of the Mint in 1936, to celebrate the 150th anniversary of the 1786 incorporation of the independent city of Lynchburg, Virginia. The obverse of the coin depicts former Secretary of the Treasury and U.S. Senator Carter Glass, a native of Lynchburg. The reverse depicts a statue of the Goddess of Liberty, with Lynchburg sites behind her, including the Old Courthouse and the city's Confederate monument.

Glass sponsored legislation for the half dollar, which passed Congress without difficulty. The Commission of Fine Arts proposed that the coin should bear the portrait of John Lynch, founder of Lynchburg, on the obverse, but no portrait of him was known. Instead, the Lynchburg Sesqui-Centennial Association decided Senator Glass should be on the coin. Despite his opposition, Glass became the third living person to appear on a U.S. coin, and the first to be shown alone.

The coins sold well when placed on sale in the late summer of 1936, and sales to out-of-towners were limited. The entire issue sold out, with some put aside for the sesquicentennial celebrations in October. Issued for $1 (equivalent to $23 in 2025), the coins have appreciated over the years, with 2018 estimates of value ranging between $225 and $365, depending on condition.

== Background ==
The Lynchburg Sesqui-Centennial Association desired to have a commemorative half dollar honoring the anniversary of the Virginia General Assembly's 1786 first mention of the incorporation of Lynchburg; it became a city in 1852. In 1936, commemorative coins were not sold by the government—Congress, in authorizing legislation, usually designated an organization with exclusive rights to purchase them at face value and vend to the public at a premium. In the case of the Lynchburg half dollar, the responsible group would be the Sesqui-Centennial Association.

The year 1936 saw Congress authorize 15 new commemorative coin issues, and pieces authorized in prior years were struck again, dated 1936. That year saw a major boom in commemorative coin prices, and the new issues helped fuel the market. Some of these new issues, like the Cincinnati Musical Center half dollar, were controlled by insiders for private profit. The Lynchburg piece, on the other hand, would defray the cost of the anniversary celebrations, and was motivated by pride in the city and its history. Lynchburg was a supply center for the Confederacy during the Civil War; a Union attempt to take the city was beaten back in 1864 by Confederate General Jubal Early. In 1858, Carter Glass, later Secretary of the Treasury and a representative and senator from Virginia, was born there, and lived there in 1936.

== Legislation ==
Glass introduced the bill for a Lynchburg Sesquicentennial half dollar in the Senate on April 8, 1936; it was referred to the Committee on Banking and Currency. On April 22, Alva B. Adams of Colorado reported it back to the Senate. In its report, the committee noted that the bill included the standardized language it advocated because of past commemorative coin abuses: including that they be issued by only one mint and no fewer than 5,000 at a time, have only one design, be struck within a year of enactment, and bear the date 1936 even if struck later. The committee recommended the bill pass.

On April 24, Adams brought the bill before the Senate, and moved that the authorized quantity of the coins be increased from 10,000 to 20,000. Both the amendment and the bill were agreed to without debate or recorded opposition. The bill then went to the House of Representatives where on May 22, Virginia's Clifton A. Woodrum brought it to the floor. Robert F. Rich of Pennsylvania, a Republican, took the floor long enough to note that "this is, perhaps, the thirtieth bill of this kind to come in here this session of Congress. It is surely the beginning of Democratic inflation, and I warn the Members of the House to beware." Following laughter and applause, the bill passed without objection, and with the signature of President Franklin D. Roosevelt on May 28, 1936, became a law authorizing 20,000 half dollars.

== Preparation ==
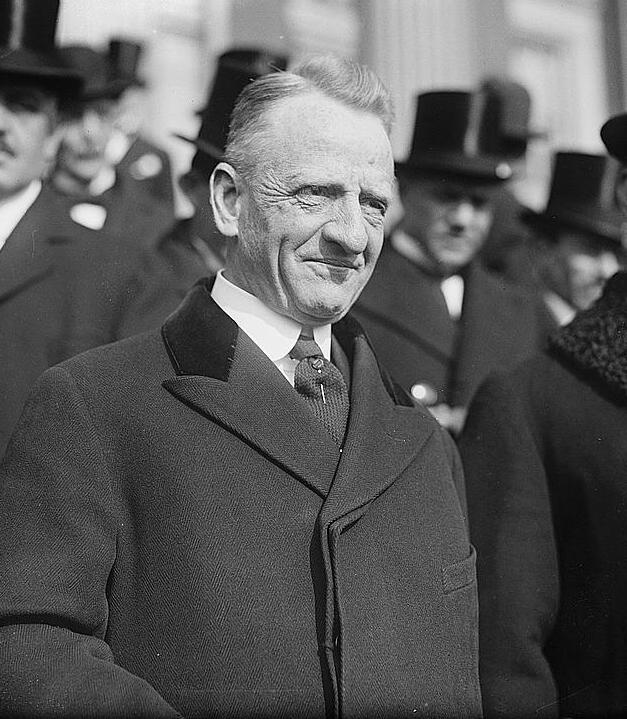
Senator Carter Glass

On May 25, 1936, with the Lynchburg bill close to enactment, the secretary of the Sesqui-Centennial Association, Fred McWane, wrote to Charles S. Moore, chairman of the federal Commission of Fine Arts. The commission was charged by a 1921 executive order by President Warren G. Harding with rendering advisory opinions regarding public artworks, including coins. Moore replied on the 26th, suggesting that the coin should bear the portrait of John Lynch, founder of Lynchburg, on the obverse. McWane replied the following day, stating that there was no known portrait of Lynch, and that the Sesqui-Centennial Association was considering other possible obverses. For the reverse, McWane proposed the city's Memorial Terrace, long the first sight there that greeted visitors arriving by rail.

On June 3, McWane wrote to Moore stating that the Sesqui-Centennial Association was considering Charles Keck and John David Brcin to sculpt the coin; Moore in his reply on the 9th, praised both men, but praised Keck more. Keck had designed the 1915 Panama-Pacific gold dollar and the Vermont Sesquicentennial half dollar in 1927. The Sesqui-Centennial Association took the hint and McWane notified Moore of Keck's hiring on July 1. He also advised Moore that his commission had decided Senator Glass should appear on the obverse.

Glass protested at the idea of his face appearing on a coin, but this was to no avail. He telephoned the Philadelphia Mint in the hope a law might forbid himself, as a living person, from appearing on a coin, but was told that none did. The senator stated, "I had hoped there would be an avenue of escape." According to Don Taxay in his volume on U.S. commemorative coins, "though [Glass was] the most influential man in Lynchburg, and honorary president of the Sesquicentennial Association, he found himself hopelessly outvoted". On July 28, Mary Margaret O'Reilly, the assistant director of the Mint, forwarded Keck's models to the Fine Arts Commission; they were approved the following day. Moore wrote to Glass on the 31st, predicting that the senator's depiction was one "that both your friends and posterity will approve". Keck's models were sent to the Medallic Art Company of New York, which reduced them to coin-sized dies.

== Design ==
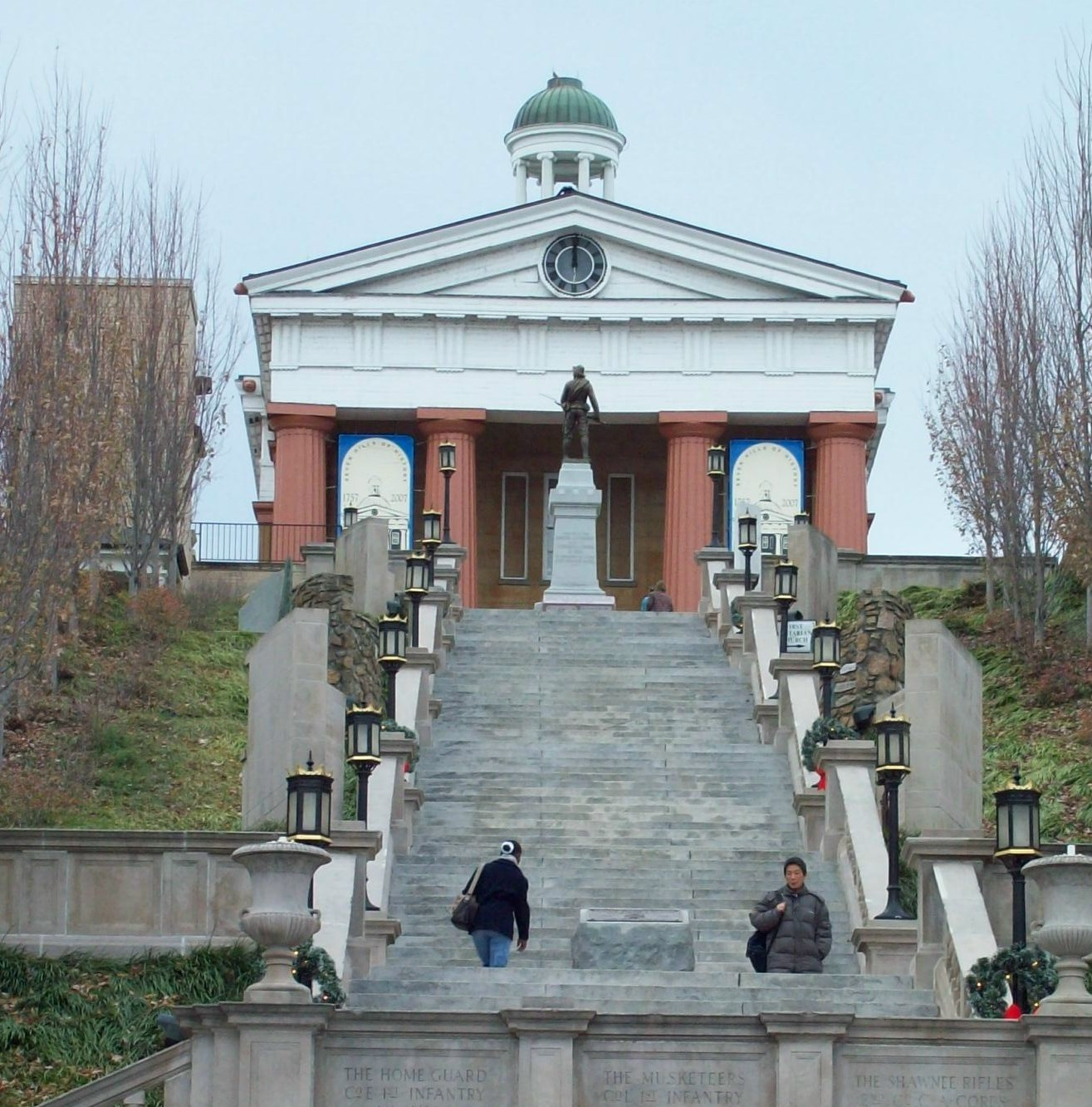
The half dollar depicts the Lynchburg Courthouse, Confederate Memorial and Monument Terrace.

The obverse contains a representation of Senator Carter Glass, making the Lynchburg Sesquicentennial half dollar the third U.S. coin to depict a living person, and the first to show one alone—the earlier two, the Alabama Centennial half dollar (1921) and the U.S. Sesquicentennial half dollar (1926), depict jugate busts of a living person, a governor or president, with a deceased predecessor. (Note: The Alabama coin depicts Thomas Kilby, the governor in 1921, with William Bibb, Alabama's first governor. The U.S. Sesquicentennial piece shows the president in 1926, Calvin Coolidge, with the first U.S. president, George Washington. The Arkansas-Robinson half dollar, also issued in 1936, depicts Joseph Taylor Robinson alone.) Glass also became the first person to have his signature on U.S. currency (during his term as Treasury Secretary) and his portrait on a coin. Having headed the Treasury Department, he was aware of the custom that living people did not appear on U.S. coinage; its waiver in his case did not attract unfavorable criticism, as it was deemed well-deserved.

The reverse depicts a statue of the goddess Liberty, her arms outstretched in welcome. In the background is seen a portion of Monument Terrace, with the Old Lynchburg Courthouse also depicted. Before the building is the city's Confederate monument. According to Anthony Swiatek in his 2012 volume on commemorative coins, "the Confederacy receives prominent recognition on this coin". Amid the debate over the removal of Confederate monuments in the United States, the question of whether to displace that statue, dedicated in 1900, has been raised, but as of 2017, it remains in place.

Art historian Cornelius Vermeule, in his volume on U.S. commemorative coins and medals, deemed Keck's half dollar, "a successful but not startling combination of conservative elements". He described the figure of Liberty on the reverse as "a Greco-Roman, actually Greek imperial, frontal Liberty placed before local landmarks". Vermeule suggested that the tall, thin lettering on the reverse indicates that Keck was less influenced by Augustus Saint-Gaudens, under whom he studied, than by Chief Engraver of the United States Mint Charles E. Barber (served 1880–1917) and his successor George T. Morgan (1917–1925). Further, Vermeule tied Keck's Liberty to coins and medals designed by the two chief engravers, including their work on medals for the Assay Commission. He concluded that Keck's "style, as manifest in the Lynchburg Sesquicentennial half-dollar, was a recollection of the fashions perpetuated by Barber and Morgan".

== Production, distribution and collecting ==
In September 1936, the Philadelphia Mint struck 20,000 Lynchburg half dollars, plus 13 extra that would be held for inspection and testing at the 1937 meeting of the annual Assay Commission. The new coins came on the market during the price boom in commemorative coins, and readily sold at a price of $1 each. There was an order limit of 10 per person, though this might be waived if there was a written explanation. Orders were accepted in advance, and the August 1936 issue of The Numismatist (the journal of the American Numismatic Association) contained a statement from the Sesqui-Centennial Association that orders for 2,000 had been received. Once 15,000 had been sold, the remainder was held to allow local residents the opportunity to buy them. On September 2, McWane wrote to a potential out-of-state buyer stating that they had all been purchased. They were formally placed on sale on September 21. Some were put aside for sale at the sesquicentennial celebration, held in Lynchburg from October 12 to 16, where they sold, mainly to local residents.

The coins increased in price after 1936, their value helped by the wide distribution of the mintage, with no known hoards. By 1940, the value in uncirculated condition was $2, and by 1970 $40. At the height of the later commemorative coin boom in 1980, they sold for $550, dropping back to $375 by 1985. The deluxe edition of R. S. Yeoman's A Guide Book of United States Coins, published in 2018, lists the coin for between $225 and $365, depending on condition. An exceptional specimen sold in 2008 for $4,830.

== Sources ==
- Bowers, Q. David (1992). Commemorative Coins of the United States: A Complete Encyclopedia. Wolfeboro, NH: Bowers and Merena Galleries, Inc. ISBN 978-0-943161-35-8.
- Bullowa, David M. (1938). "The Commemorative Coinage of the United States 1892–1938". Numismatic Notes and Monographs (83). New York: American Numismatic Society: i–192. JSTOR 43607181.(subscription required)
- Flynn, Kevin (2008). The Authoritative Reference on Commemorative Coins 1892–1954. Roswell, GA: Kyle Vick. OCLC 711779330.
- Slabaugh, Arlie R. (1975). United States Commemorative Coinage (2nd ed.). Racine, WI: Whitman Publishing. ISBN 978-0-307-09377-6.
- Swiatek, Anthony (2012). Encyclopedia of the Commemorative Coins of the United States. Chicago: KWS Publishers. ISBN 978-0-9817736-7-4.
- Swiatek, Anthony; Breen, Walter (1981). The Encyclopedia of United States Silver & Gold Commemorative Coins, 1892 to 1954. New York: Arco Publishing. ISBN 978-0-668-04765-4.
- Taxay, Don (1967). An Illustrated History of U.S. Commemorative Coinage. New York: Arco Publishing. ISBN 978-0-668-01536-3.
- Vermeule, Cornelius (1971). Numismatic Art in America. Cambridge, MA: The Belknap Press of Harvard University Press. ISBN 978-0-674-62840-3.
- Yeoman, R.S. (2018). A Guide Book of United States Coins 2014 (Mega Red 4th ed.). Atlanta, GA: Whitman Publishing, LLC. ISBN 978-0-7948-4580-3.
