= William Andrew Smith =

American college president and clergyman (1802–1870)

- Born: November 29, 1802; Fredericksburg, Virginia, U.S.
- Died: March 1, 1870 (aged 67); Richmond, Virginia, U.S.
- Resting place: Hollywood Cemetery
- Occupations: Educator; clergyman

William Andrew Smith (November 29, 1802 – March 1, 1870) was an American college president and clergyman. He was selected as president of Randolph–Macon College in Ashland, Virginia in 1846. He also taught while at the institution, and held pro-Slavery views.

== Life and career ==
William Andrew Smith was born on November 29, 1802, in Fredericksburg, Virginia, to William & Mary (Porter) Smith. William Andrew's mother died of illness in 1804 and his father was killed by business associates in 1813.

Smith was a preacher for the Methodist Episcopal Church, being admitted on trial in 1825 and becoming a full preacher in 1827. Smith was elected president of Randolph–Macon College in Ashland, Virginia in 1846. He was also a professor of moral and intellectual philosophy at the college.

In 1839, while Smith was serving in Lynchburg, Virginia, he was lent a cradle by Methodist bishop John Early. The cradle unexplainably rocked back and forth of its own accord and was widely believed to be haunted. The cradle is now held by the Lynchburg Museum.

Smith was pro-slavery and published a series of lectures titled "Lectures on the Philosophy and Practice of Slavery, as Exhibited in the Institution of Domestic Slavery in the United States: with the Duties of Masters to Slaves" in 1856. In 1866, Smith resigned from his position as president. He went on to become the pastor of Centenary Church in St. Louis, Missouri. In 1868, Smith was selected to be the fifth president of Central College (now Central Methodist University) in Fayette, Missouri, as it resumed operations after the American Civil War.

Smith died on March 1, 1870, in Richmond, Virginia. He was buried in Hollywood Cemetery.

Academic offices
Preceded by Landon Cabell Garland	President of Randolph-Macon College; 1846–1866	Succeeded by Thomas Carter Johnson
Preceded by W.A. Anderson	President of Central Methodist University; 1868–1870	Succeeded by F.X. Forster
