= John Early (bishop) =

American pro-slavery Methodist minister (1786–1873)

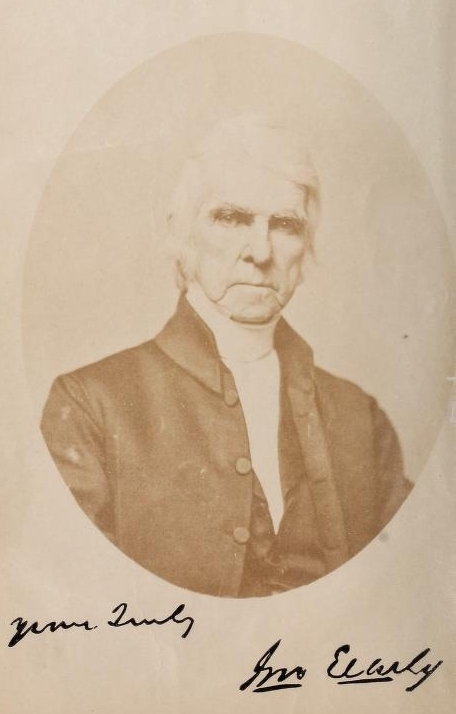
- Born: January 1, 1786; Bedford County, Virginia, U.S.
- Died: November 5, 1873 (aged 87); Lynchburg, Virginia, U.S.
- Resting place: Spring Hill cemetery, Lynchburg, Virginia, U.S.
- Education: Doctor of Divinity
- Occupation: Clergyman
- Known for: civic engagement, finance, publishing
- Title: Bishop
- Political party: Whig
- Spouses: Ann Winnifred Jones; Elizabeth Browne Rives
- Relatives: First cousin twice removed of Jubal Early

John Early (January 1, 1786 – November 5, 1873) was instrumental in organizing the Methodist Episcopal Church, South, and was their bishop from 1854.

== Early and family life ==
John Early was born in the Forest, Virginia neighborhood of Bedford County, Virginia, to Joshua Early (1738–1812) and his wife, the former Mary Leftwich (1746–1818). He married Ann Winnifred Jones (1790–1820) in 1815 and Elizabeth Browne Rives (1805–1857) in 1822. He fathered seven children in his second marriage.

== Career ==
Although his parents were Baptist, Early awakened to Methodism in 1804, appreciating early circuit riders' eloquence and fire at camp meetings. He was licensed to preach by the Virginia Annual Conference of the Methodist Episcopal Church in 1806. He began his labors among slaves of Thomas Jefferson concentrated to erect a retreat styled Poplar Forest. Early was received on trial in 1807 and dispatched to preach along a Meherrin River circuit reaching into North Carolina before being ordained a Deacon by Bishop Francis Asbury in 1809. Ordained an Elder in 1811, Rev. Early was assigned to the Greenville, North Carolina circuit of the Virginia Conference. He was credited with converting a thousand souls in week-long camp meeting at Prospect, Virginia in 1815. He stepped into church administration with 1817 appointment as Presiding Elder on his circuits.

Parson Early was ambivalent toward slavery until inheriting souls at his father's 1812 death. He married well and settled in Lynchburg, Virginia where, in 1823 he was among incorporators of The Lynchburg Charity School, the town's "first organized effort for public education." Early was named a Trustee when the Virginia Legislature chartered Randolph–Macon College in 1830: he was elected President of that board, chaired its inaugural Building Committee and served the college as Rector and business agent. His term as Trustee (1830–1873) is longest in the college's history.

He presided over formation of the Lynchburg Chapter of the American Colonization Society in 1825. From 1825 Early was involved in banking, and used his preaching and organizational skills to promote internal improvements including Lynchburg and Salem Turnpike, James River and Kanawha Canal and Virginia and Tennessee Railroad. He served in 1837 as inaugural trustee for the Female Collegiate Institute at Buckingham Female Collegiate Institute Historic District ... the first chartered college for women in Virginia, and much of the nation. All while secretary to or presiding over Methodists' Virginia Annual Conference in almost unbroken streak from 1822 to 1850. Early acquired two plantations and at least sixteen slaves in that interim.

Retaining Methodists' pro-slavery position kept other clergymen from electing him bishop at Methodist Episcopal General Conference of 1832. Methodist Episcopal Bishops appointed John Early to a Committee that developed a Plan of Separation in 1844 as the denomination split over abolition. The following year "delegates of the several conferences of the Methodist Episcopal church in slaveholding states" elected Early President pro tempore at inaugural convening of what would become the Methodist Episcopal Church, South. He was appointed to chair Committees of Organization and Finance; delegates elected him their business agent. Through ultimate fiscal settlement in 1855, Early represented Southern publishing entities as assets were ultimately divvied up by ruling from the Supreme Court of the United States.

In 1839, Early lent Methodist minister William Andrew Smith a cradle, while Smith was pastor in Lynchburg, Virginia. The cradle unexplainably rocked back and forth of its own accord and was widely believed to be haunted. The cradle is now held by the Lynchburg Museum.

As Book Agent for the new denomination, Early in 1854 established the highest-capacity printing plant (at Nashville, Tennessee) south of the United States Government Publishing Office. That year he was elected Bishop. He oversaw expansion of church missions onto Indian Reservations and among plantation owners. Polyglot Bibles printed by the Book Concern were directed at mission efforts he promoted there and in Mexico and China.

Early was made a founding trustee of Central University, endowed by Southern Methodists, in 1858. (It was reorganized as Vanderbilt University in 1872.)

During the American Civil War, Bishop Early supported the Confederate States of America. Among countless other responsibilities, he presided over the multi-state Holston Annual Conference (1862–1865), as preachers deemed disloyal were suspended without due process. At conclusion of hostilities, Bishop Early met with U.S. President Andrew Johnson and coordinated with administrators of military occupation to retake possession of various church properties seized in war.

Having alienated clergymen in the General Conference for maladministration of the Holston Conference, he was pressed to resign from the College of Bishops in 1866; yet was encouraged to remain self-directed in episcopal affairs. Grievously injured later that year in a railroad accident, Bishop Early recovered to prevail in relocating Randolph-Macon College from Boydton, Virginia to Ashland, Virginia and see that it was staffed and received new endowment. The Book Concern, plundered at Nashville, was also retrieved from military authorities and – with scrip and creative financing – restored to operation.

== Death and legacy ==
Rev. Early died at his manse in 1873. He was interred at Spring Hill Cemetery at Lynchburg. (For which Early and wife Elizabeth had donated land, and over whose organization he had presided in 1852.)

Early was credited with introducing Standing Committees to the General Conference of the Methodist Episcopal Church. Due to his extraordinary longevity, peers at his death associated Early as connecting link to Asbury and establishment of Methodist Society in America. Historians sought him out. "He knows what is in the [Methodist's Book of] Discipline, having helped to put it there. He knows what the General Conferences have said, and decided, without reference to 'Proceedings.' He was present, and helped them to say, decide, and make up their 'Proceedings.' The rules which ordinarily govern deliberative bodies are as familiar to him as forty years' practice can make them," wrote a chronicler in 1856.

Early 1822–1829 backed establishment of the Lynchburg Water Works. Clay Street Reservoir remains extant on land he conveyed to the project. The adjacent Court Street United Methodist Church (at 7th St.) stands on the site of Court Street Station, a Methodist edifice Early helped organize and finance in 1850. His manse was cater-corner to the 1851 structure. (The home was relocated to 3890 Peakland Place c1935.)

Randolph-Macon College received many of his papers as a gift upon its centennial. J. Rives Childs submitted transcripts of John Early's 1807–1814 Diary to the Virginia Magazine of History and Biography between 1925 & 1932, available at JSTOR. Others are spread out among a dozen other institutions. The Virginia Historical Society holds an oil portrait of John Early, attributed to John Blennerhassett Martin.

== See also ==
- List of bishops of the United Methodist Church

== Bibliography ==
- Gross, Ernie. This Day in Religion. New York: Neil-Schuman Publishers, 1990. ISBN 1-55570-045-4.
