= Alabama Centennial half dollar =

US commemorative coin

- United States
- Value: 50 cents (0.50 US dollars)
- Mass: 12.5 g
- Diameter: 30.61 mm (1.20 in)
- Thickness: 2.15 mm (0.08 in)
- Edge: Reeded
- Composition: 90.0% silver; 10.0% copper
- Silver: 0.36169 troy oz
- Years of minting: 1921
- Mintage: Without "2X2": 64,038 including 38 pieces for the Assay Commission With "2X2": 6,006 including 6 assay pieces
- Mint marks: None, all pieces struck at the Philadelphia Mint without mint mark

Obverse
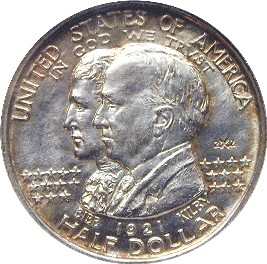
- Design: Thomas Kilby and William Bibb
- Designer: Laura Gardin Fraser
- Design date: 1921

Reverse
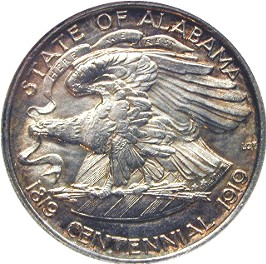
- Design: Adaptation of the State Seal of Alabama.
- Designer: Laura Gardin Fraser
- Design date: 1921

The Alabama Centennial half dollar, or Alabama half dollar, was a commemorative fifty-cent coin struck by the United States Bureau of the Mint in 1921 as a belated acknowledgement of the 100th anniversary of Alabama's admission to the Union in 1819. The coin was created by Laura Gardin Fraser, the first woman credited with designing a coin.

Alabama Congressman Lilius Bratton Rainey introduced legislation for a commemorative coin at the request of the state's centennial commission. The bill originally provided for commemorative quarters but was amended to provide for halves instead. The bill moved quickly through the legislative process and became the Act of May 10, 1920, with the signature of President Woodrow Wilson.

The half dollars were not issued until October 1921, apparently because the initial decision to depict President Wilson, a Democrat, on the coin might be reversed depending on the results of the 1920 presidential election. After Republican Warren G. Harding won the presidency, the sponsors of the issue chose to depict William Bibb, the State of Alabama's first governor, and Thomas Kilby, its governor at the time of the centennial, thus making Governor Kilby the first living person to appear on a U.S. coin. (Note: Other living persons who appeared on U.S. coins include Calvin Coolidge on the United States Sesquicentennial half dollar in 1926, and in 1936, Joseph Taylor Robinson on the Arkansas-Robinson half dollar and Carter Glass on the Lynchburg Sesquicentennial half dollar.) To boost sales, a symbol, 2X2 (recognizing Alabama as the 22nd state) was included in the design for a minority of the coins; these are generally more expensive today.

== Inception ==
Alabama was admitted to the Union in 1819, and celebrated its centennial in 1919. The Alabama Centennial Commission sponsored local celebrations in the state in 1919 and 1920, but was beginning to wind down its operations before it began the push for a centennial coin. Numismatists Anthony Swiatek and Walter Breen later speculated that the members heard of other states which had received or which sought a commemorative coin, and, out of local pride, wanted the same for Alabama. The coin would also help with fundraising, and the proceeds were to be used for "historical and monumental" purposes. Commission members persuaded local congressman Lilius Bratton Rainey to push for passage of a bill authorizing a coin.

In 1920, commemorative coins were not sold by the government—Congress, in authorizing legislation, usually designated an organization which had the exclusive right to purchase them at face value and vend them to the public at a premium. Although not mentioned in the legislation, in the case of the Alabama Centennial half-dollar, the centennial commission was the authorized group.

== Legislation ==
Rainey introduced legislation for an Alabama Centennial half-dollar in the House of Representatives on February 28, 1920, with the bill designated as H.R. 12824. It was referred to the Committee on Coinage, Weights and Measures, of which Indiana Congressman Albert Vestal was the chairman. That committee held hearings on the bill on March 26, 1920, as well as on the coinage proposal that would become the Pilgrim Tercentenary half dollar, with the Alabama coin the first order of business. Congressman Rainey, in his bill, had asked for 100,000 quarter dollars, and while addressing the committee stated that the sole criticism of his coinage proposal in the Alabama press was one article suggesting he should have asked for double the amount. The choice of denomination came as a surprise to committee member William A. Ashbrook of Ohio, a coin collector, who asked why Rainey was not asking for half dollars, as other states had. Rainey was amenable to that, and also accepted Ashbrook's discouragement when the Alabamian wanted to double the authorized number of coins. The committee voted to recommend Rainey's bill, with an amendment to provide for half dollars instead of quarters, and then proceeded to consider the Pilgrim proposal. Vestal had two days previously written to Treasury Secretary David F. Houston about the Pilgrim coin, and Houston responded that while his department had not opposed the Maine Centennial (previously approved by the committee) or Alabama coinage bills, the Treasury had concerns that issuing large numbers of different designs would aid fraudsters. Vestal issued a report on behalf of his committee on March 27, 1920, indicating his committee's support for the Alabama bill once amended, and attaching the note from Secretary Houston.

The three coinage bills—Maine Centennial, Alabama Centennial, and Pilgrim Tercentenary—were considered in that order by the House of Representatives on April 21, 1920. As the Maine piece was considered, Ohio's Warren Gard asked questions about the bill's provisions, though he did not object to its passage. When the Alabama bill came to the floor, Vestal yielded time for a statement in favor from Rainey, which began with a brief explanation of the bill followed by a much longer paean to the glorious history of his home state, and his conclusion drew applause. Gard then questioned Vestal, and learned that another coin, the Pilgrim one, was next on the House's agenda. Gard expressed his concerns about commemorative coins, "but for the life of me I can not see what advantage there is for a State celebration to gather up a lot of coins with a particular stamp on them. It seems to me rather to cheapen the national coin. because it looks like an old-fashioned medal at a county fair rather than the half-dollar of the daddies, to use the old expression. (Note: The "dollar of the daddies" was one way that advocates of free silver called the U.S. dollar of old, which from 1792 had been equivalent to a set amount of either gold or silver, until the passage of the Coinage Act of 1873. For further background, see Cross of Gold speech.) I think that these propositions are open to serious objection, which, of course, should be voiced to the Secretary of the Treasury." Vestal agreed to pass on Gard's concerns to Secretary Houston, and the Alabama bill passed without dissent, to be followed by the Pilgrim one, again after questioning from Gard.

The following day, April 22, 1920, the House notified the Senate of its passage of the Alabama bill. It was referred to the Senate Committee on Banking and Currency; on April 28, Connecticut's George P. McLean reported it back with a recommendation it pass.

On May 3, McLean asked that the three coin bills (Maine, Alabama and Pilgrim) be considered by the Senate immediately, rather than waiting their turns, but Utah Senator Reed Smoot objected: Smoot's attempt to bring up an anti-dumping trade bill had just been objected to by Charles S. Thomas of Colorado. Smoot, however, stated if the bills had not been reached by about 2:00 pm, there would probably not be any objection. When McLean tried again to advance the coin bills, Kansas' Charles Curtis asked if there was any urgency. McLean replied that as the three coin bills were to mark ongoing anniversaries, there was a need to have them authorized and get the production process started. All three bills passed the Senate without opposition and the Alabama bill was enacted with the signature of President Woodrow Wilson on May 10, 1920.

== Preparation ==
The Seal of Alabama as it appeared in 1920

Alabama Governor Thomas Kilby had a three-member commission headed by Marie Bankhead Owen decide what design the state should recommend for the coins, and it solicited proposals from the public, but rejected all submissions. On June 1, 1920, Owen proposed to Kilby that one side have a depiction of the Alabama Capitol building and the other jugate heads of James Monroe (president at the time of Alabama's admission in 1819) and Woodrow Wilson (president in 1919). Kilby sent the proposal, which included rough sketches, to the Director of the Mint, Raymond T. Baker, who forwarded it to the Commission of Fine Arts for its opinion. Its sculptor-member, James Earle Fraser, designer of the Buffalo nickel, disliked the capitol as a subject, feeling that buildings never translated well to coins. When this went back through channels to Owen, her committee reconsidered the building, and on June 24 she wrote to Baker substituting a design based on the Seal of Alabama, focused upon the eagle that was then a part of it, and if that was not acceptable, Owen suggested the design of the half-dollar current in 1819. There the matter rested for an entire year.

Swiatek and Breen described the Alabama half-dollar as caught up in the presidential election of 1920, as a Republican administration might not be willing to put the Democrat Wilson on a coin, or might insist on the new incumbent appearing, something likely to dampen sales in Alabama, part of the Democratic Solid South. The Republican, Ohio Senator Warren G. Harding, won the election and was inaugurated in March 1921. On June 29, 1921, Owen wrote to Baker, suggesting a new pair of honorees for the coin: Kilby, the state's chief executive at the time of the 1919 centennial, and the State of Alabama's first governor, William Bibb. Cartoonist Frank Spangler of the Montgomery Advertiser prepared sketches of the new design. At James Fraser's suggestion, the plaster models were created by his wife, Laura Gardin Fraser, who was a noted sculptor in her own right. She shipped her completed work to the Commission of Fine Arts on September 22, 1921, and gained members' approval; the models were then sent to the Philadelphia Mint for use in making coinage dies. Laura Fraser thus became the first woman to design a coin, not only of the U.S., but of any country.

== Design ==
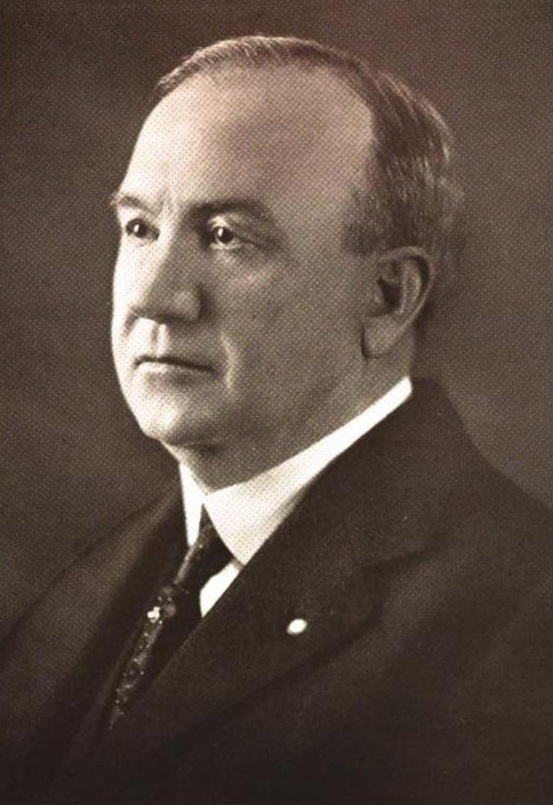
Governor Thomas Kilby

The obverse of the coin features jugate busts of Bibb, Alabama's first governor as a state, and the incumbent in 1919, Kilby. In so appearing, Kilby became the first living person depicted on a U.S. coin. Anthony Swiatek, in his volume on commemoratives, averred that the issuance was not controversial at the time, as the Act of May 16, 1866, that forbids the depiction of living people on currency was deemed to refer to paper money only, but Q. David Bowers wrote that the portrayal caused contemporary comment, for the position of the federal government (excepting some paper money issues of the 19th century) was that living people should not appear on U.S. money. A total of 22 stars flank the busts, symbolic of Alabama being the 22nd state; a message reinforced on those pieces bearing the inscription 2X2 in the obverse field. The X in that inscription alludes to the St. Andrew's cross on the flag of Alabama. The date, the names of the governors, and various other wordings appear towards the rim of the obverse.

The reverse features an eagle, possessing arrows and a shield, but no olive branch to symbolically counter the instruments of war; matched branches and arrows are often present in heraldic depiction of eagles on coins. The eagle's beak holds an end of a ribbon on which is inscribed the Alabama state motto, "HERE WE REST" about which Swiatek and Breen, in their 1988 book jibed, "no pun intended about the sleepy Deep South".

Bowers complained that the centennial dates on the reverse, plus the 1921 for the year of striking, lead to "a bewildering confusion of dates to the casual observer". Numismatic historian Don Taxay deemed the half-dollar "one of the most successful portrait coins in the commemorative series. The heads of Bibb and Kilby are true, and yet contain more than a touch of the ideal. They are beautifully related to each other. The eagle is equally fine".

Art historian Cornelius Vermeule considered the Alabama coin "a good example of the trite motifs, partly real and partly symbolic, that go into one of these statehood commemoratives". He suggested that the use of the jugate portraits "recall that this classical device was first revived in American coinage on the Washington-Lafayette silver dollar of 1900." Vermeule concluded that "vigorous lettering has saved uninteresting portraits from weakening the reverse (Note: Vermeule, following the original sketches for the half-dollar that would have put the date of issue on the side with the eagle, considered the side with the busts the reverse, in opposition to present-day numismatic practice, which considers it the obverse.) and the defiant eagle of the obverse is handled in a spirit worthy of Saint-Gaudens."

== Production, distribution, and collecting ==
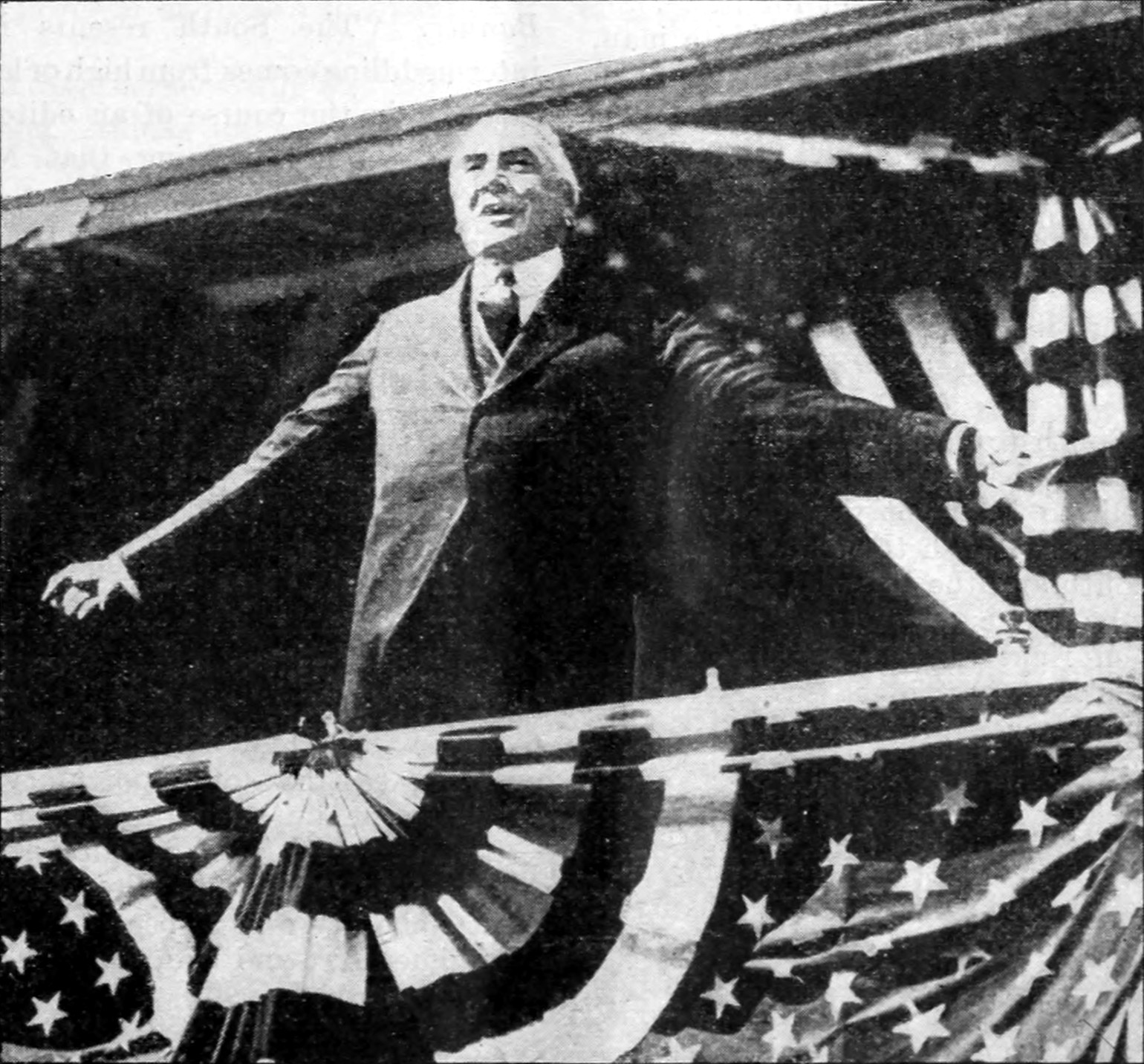
President Warren G. Harding addresses a segregated crowd in Birmingham, October 26, 1921, the first day of the coin's distribution

James Fraser had suggested to Fine Arts Commission chairman Moore that the Alabama committee be told that the Missouri Centennial half dollar issuers were having "2★4" placed on some of their coins, symbolizing Missouri being the 24th state and creating a second variety for collectors to obtain. Owen already knew of this, and "2X2" was placed on the obverse. A total of 6,006 half dollars was struck in October 1921, with six of them placed aside at Philadelphia for inspection and testing at the 1922 meeting of the annual Assay Commission.

Alabama half dollars were first placed on sale on October 26, 1921, the day of President Harding's visit to Birmingham, Alabama, where he as a Mason laid the cornerstone for the city's new Masonic temple, and as president addressed a segregated crowd, urging improvement of race relations. Coins were sold from specially-built booths constructed just off the city's sidewalks. It is uncertain whether these coins bore the 2X2 or not. Official records show that all the coins struck in October were of the 2X2 variety, and this was long accepted by numismatic historians. However, one coin collector recalled buying two of the half dollars that day, and over fifty later, all of the plain variety, and averred that none of the 2X2 could have been sold in Birmingham on the first day. As Owen wrote that the first 5,000 received bore the mark, Swiatek concluded that 1,000 of the October mintage was of the plain variety, all that was for sale in Birmingham. In December, 64,038 more were minted, with 38 set aside for assay. These were recorded to be of the plain variety. Both 2X2 and plain coins were struck from the same die; the mark was ground off to allow coinage of plain pieces.

Both varieties were sold by the centennial commission for $1, and primarily went to citizens of Alabama; banks throughout the state vended them. When they could not be sold, 5,000 of the plain variety were returned to the Mint and melted.

Although the 2X2 coins are only a tenth of the total mintage, they are considerably more common than that, as people were aware of their scarcity, with more saved and fewer spent in hard times. Bowers suggested that the mintage figures may be incorrect, and the 2X2 nearly as common as the plain variety. According to the deluxe edition of R. S. Yeoman's A Guide Book of United States Coins published in 2015, the Alabama half lists for between $85 and $650 without 2X2 and between $170 and $850 with, dependent on condition. A specimen of the plain in exceptional condition sold for $7,344 in 2014.

== See also ==
- Early United States commemorative coins
- Half dollar (United States coin)

== Sources ==
- Bowers, Q. David (1992). Commemorative Coins of the United States: A Complete Encyclopedia. Wolfeboro, NH: Bowers and Merena Galleries, Inc. ISBN 978-0-943161-35-8.
- Flynn, Kevin (2008). The Authoritative Reference on Commemorative Coins 1892–1954. Roswell, GA: Kyle Vick. OCLC 711779330.
- Sinclair, Andrew (1969) [1965]. The Available Man: The Life behind the Masks of Warren Gamaliel Harding (1st Quadrangle Paperback ed.). Chicago, IL: Quadrangle Books. OCLC 422550801 – via Questia.
- Slabaugh, Arlie R. (1975). United States Commemorative Coinage (second ed.). Racine, WI: Whitman Publishing. ISBN 978-0-307-09377-6.
- Swiatek, Anthony (2012). Encyclopedia of the Commemorative Coins of the United States. Chicago: KWS Publishers. ISBN 978-0-9817736-7-4.
- Swiatek, Anthony; Breen, Walter (1981). The Encyclopedia of United States Silver & Gold Commemorative Coins, 1892 to 1954. New York: Arco Publishing. ISBN 978-0-668-04765-4.
- Taxay, Don (1967). An Illustrated History of U.S. Commemorative Coinage. New York: Arco Publishing. ISBN 978-0-668-01536-3.
- United States House of Representatives Committee on Coinage, Weights and Measures (March 26, 1920). Authorizing Coinage of Memorial 50-Cent Piece for the State of Alabama. United States Government Printing Office.
- Vermeule, Cornelius (1971). Numismatic Art in America. Cambridge, MA: The Belknap Press of Harvard University Press. ISBN 978-0-674-62840-3.
- Yeoman, R.S. (2015). A Guide Book of United States Coins (1st Deluxe ed.). Atlanta, GA: Whitman Publishing. ISBN 978-0-7948-4307-6.
