= Cornelius Clarkson Vermeule =

Cornelius Clarkson Vermeule may refer to:

- Cornelius Clarkson Vermeule I (1858–1950), American civil engineer and topographer
- Cornelius Clarkson Vermeule II (1895–1943), his son, director of the Public Works Administration in New Jersey, United States
- Cornelius Clarkson Vermeule III (1925–2008), his son, American art historian and numismatist
