= Lynchburg Courthouse =

- U.S. National Register of Historic Places
- U.S. Historic district – Contributing property
- Virginia Landmarks Register
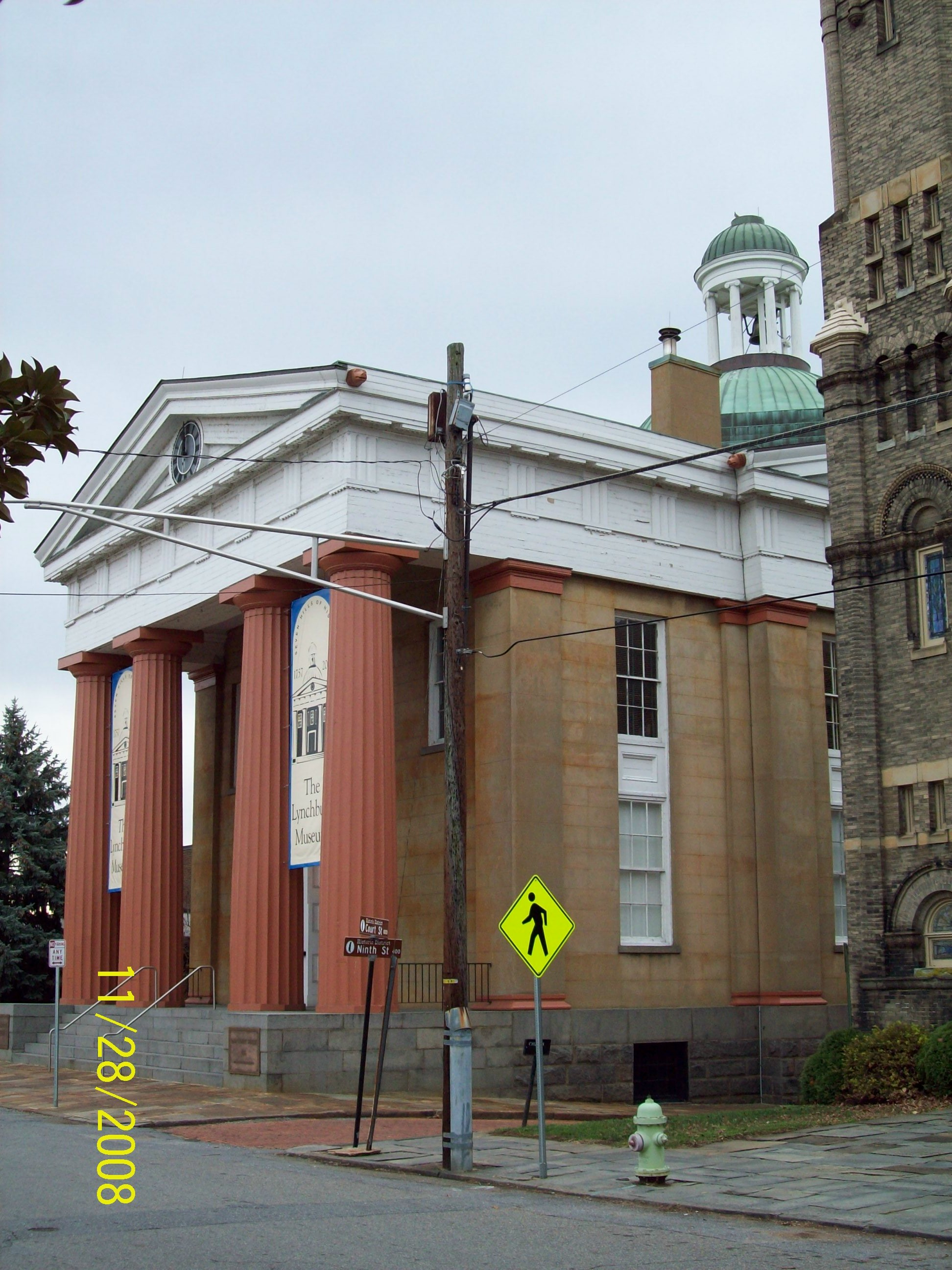
- Lynchburg Courthouse, November 2008

- Location within Virginia Location within the United States
- Location: 9th St. between Court and Church Sts., Lynchburg, Virginia
- Coordinates: 37°24′49″N 79°8′41″W
- Area: 9.9 acres (4.0 ha)
- Built: 1855
- Built by: Ellison, Andrew Jr.
- Architectural style: Greek Revival
- NRHP reference No.: 72001508
- VLR No.: 118-0002

Significant dates
- Added to NRHP: May 19, 1972
- Designated VLR: April 18, 1972

The Lynchburg Courthouse is a historic courthouse building located at Lynchburg, Virginia. Built in 1855, it occupies a prominent position overlooking the steeply descending steps of Monument Terrace. The building is executed in stucco-over-brick on a granite ashlar basement and is an example of the Greek Revival. The building is capped by a shallow dome located over the intersection of the ridges. At the top of the dome is a small open belfry consisting of a circle of small Ionic columns supporting a hemispherical dome. The front of the court house has a three-bay Doric portico.

It was listed on the National Register of Historic Places in 1972. It is located in the Court House Hill-Downtown Historic District.

== Lynchburg Museum ==
The building is now home to the Lynchburg Museum, which focuses on the history of Lynchburg and the surrounding area. Gallery themes include history, art and artisans, military history, culture, and the history of the Courthouse itself.

The museum holds the supposedly haunted cradle owned by Methodist bishop John Early, lent to Lynchburg minister William Andrew Smith.
