= Susan B. Anthony dollar =

United States dollar coin depicting Susan B. Anthony

Susan B. Anthony
- United States Of America
- Value: 1 U.S. dollar
- Mass: 8.1 g (0.260 troy oz)
- Diameter: 26.5 mm (1.04 in)
- Thickness: 2.00 mm (0.08 in)
- Edge: Reeded
- Composition: .75 copper, .25 nickel, clad to pure copper core.
- Years of minting: 1979–1981, 1999
- Mint marks: P (Philadelphia Mint); D (Denver Mint); S (San Francisco Mint)

Obverse
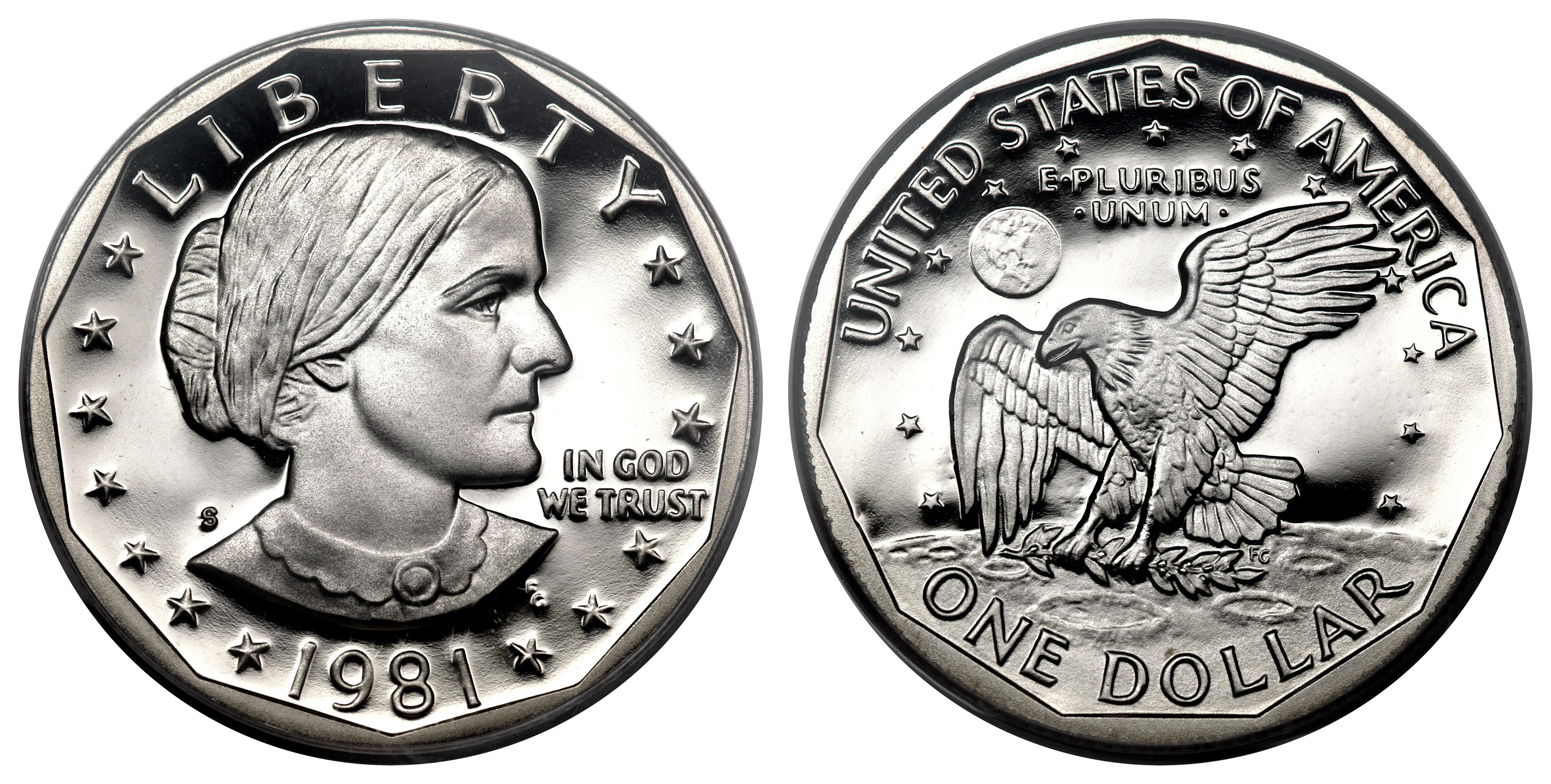
- The obverse of a Susan B. Anthony dollar
- Design: Right-facing profile of Susan B. Anthony
- Designer: Frank Gasparro
- Design date: 1979

Reverse
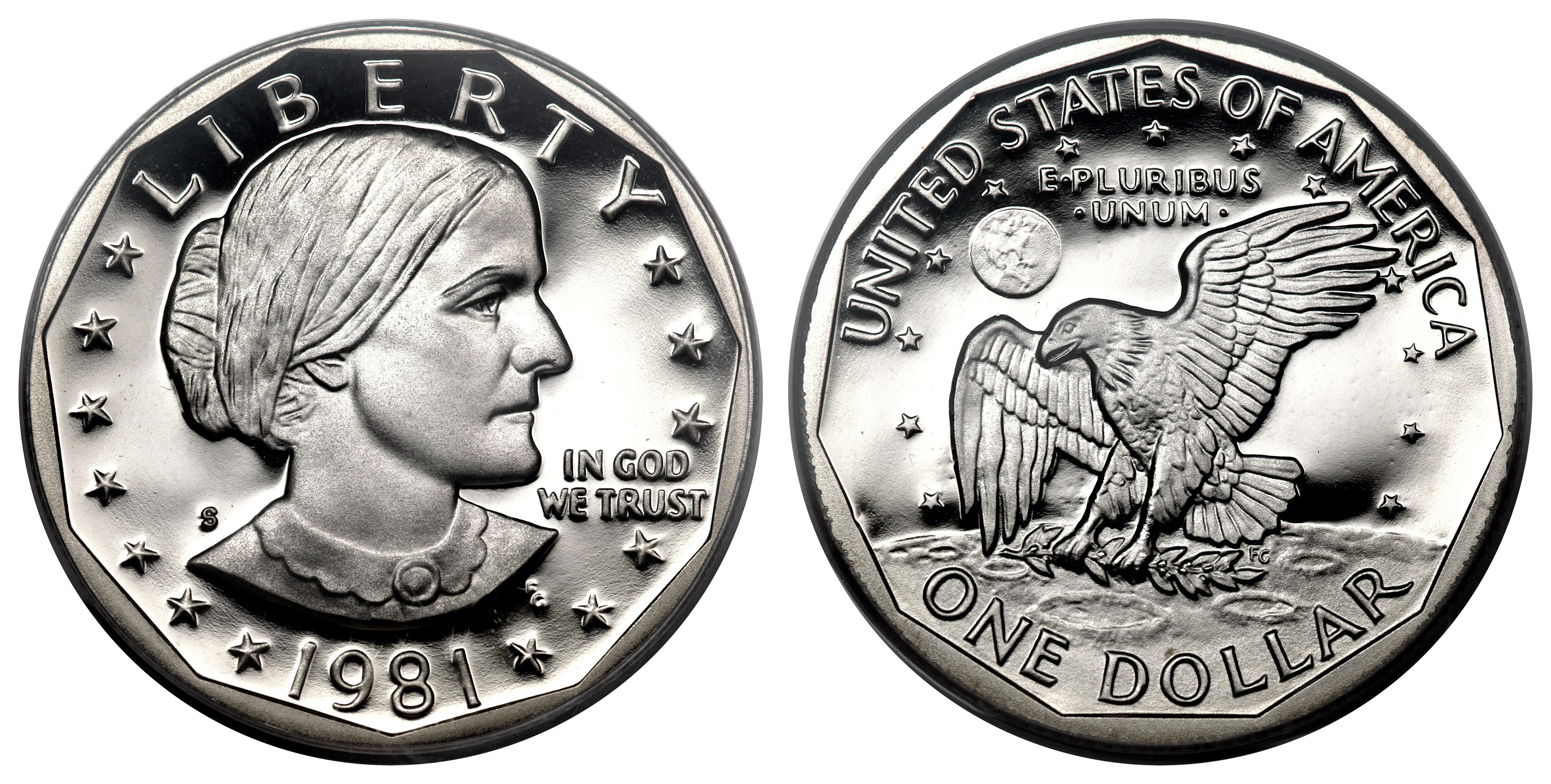
- The reverse of a Susan B. Anthony dollar
- Design: An eagle clutching a laurel branch in its talons displayed over a landscape of the Moon, based on the Apollo 11 mission insignia
- Designer: Frank Gasparro
- Design date: 1971

The Susan B. Anthony dollar is a United States dollar coin minted from 1979 to 1981, when production was suspended due to poor public acceptance, and then again in 1999. Intended as a replacement for the larger Eisenhower dollar, the new smaller one-dollar coin went through testing of several shapes and compositions, but all were opposed by the vending machine industry, a powerful lobby affecting coin legislation. Finally, a round planchet with an eleven-sided inner border was chosen for the smaller dollar.

The original design for the smaller dollar coin depicted an allegorical representation of Liberty on the obverse, but organizations and individuals in Congress called for the coin to depict a real woman. Several proposals were submitted, and social reformer Susan B. Anthony was selected as the design subject. The reverse design of the Eisenhower dollar was retained, an engraving of the Apollo 11 mission insignia showing an eagle landing on the Moon. Both sides of the coin, as well as the rejected Liberty design, were created by Frank Gasparro, the Chief Engraver of the United States Mint.

One and a half billion coins were struck in anticipation of considerable public demand, but the Anthony dollar was poorly received, in part because of confusion caused by its similarity in size and metallic composition to the quarter. Despite its poor reception and most of the coins reposing in Treasury and bank vaults, the Anthony dollar eventually began seeing use in vending machines and mass transit systems, depleting the surplus by the late 1990s. In 1997, Congress passed a law authorizing the mintage of a new gold-colored one-dollar coin depicting Sacagawea, but production could not begin quickly enough to meet demand. As a stopgap measure, until the new Sacagawea dollar coin could be issued, the Anthony dollar was struck again in 1999 after an eighteen-year hiatus; the series was retired the following year.

Special coins for sale to collectors were struck in proof finish through the run of the Susan B. Anthony dollar, and some minting variations are valuable to collectors. However, most circulation strikes remained in government stockpiles for several years after minting, so many of the coins are available in uncirculated grades, and the premium over face value is minimal.

== Background ==
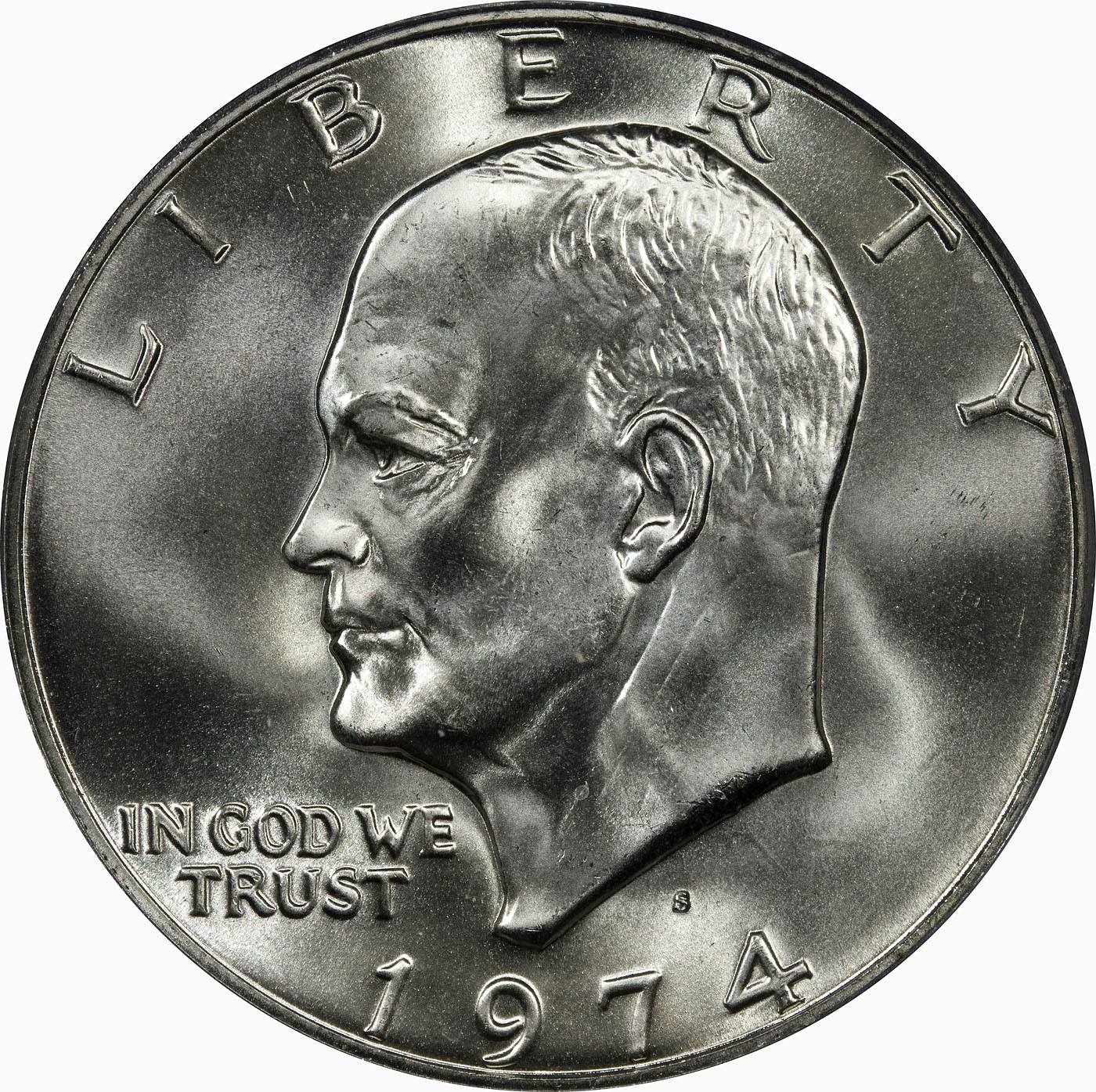
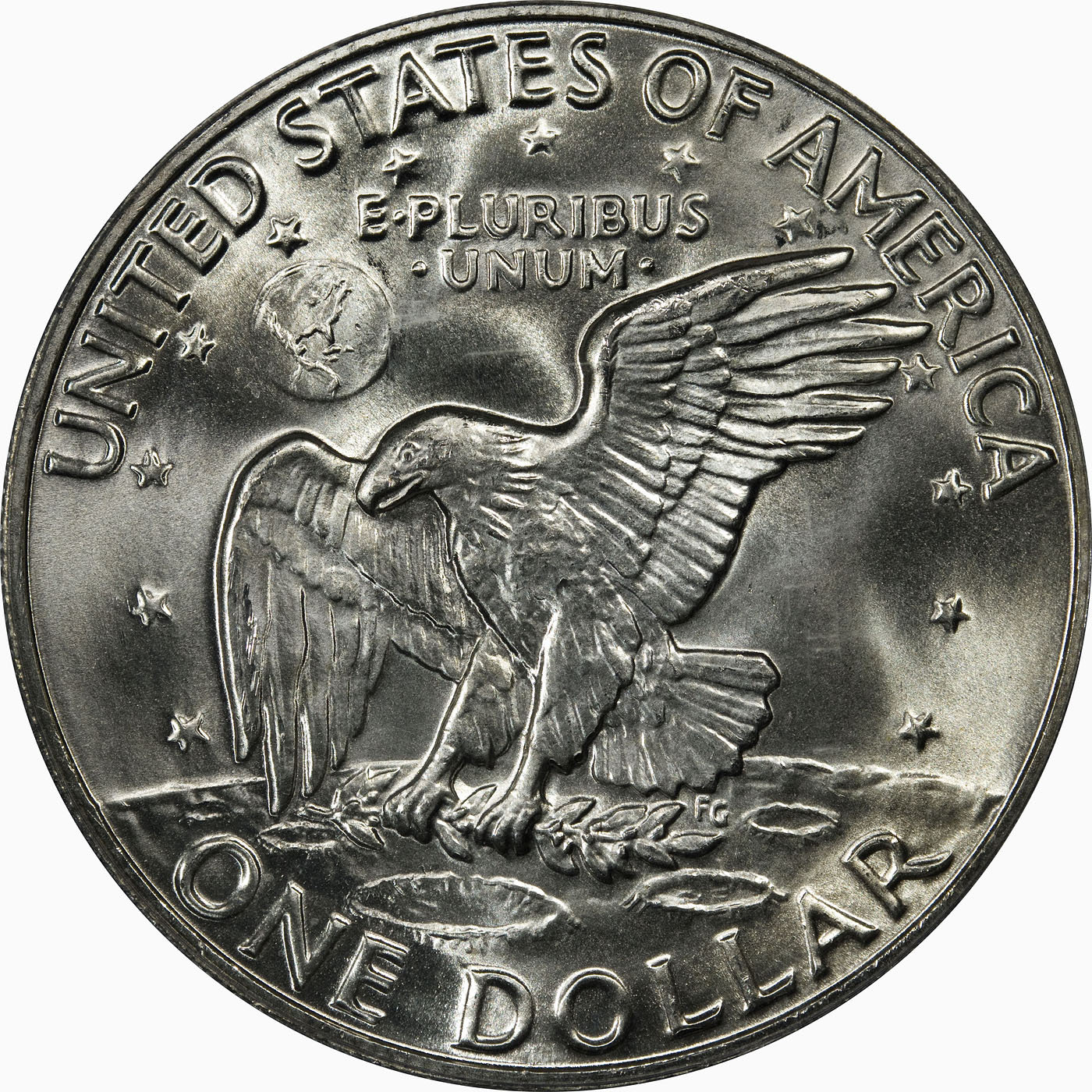
The Eisenhower dollar was authorized by a bill signed into law on December 31, 1970.

In the early 1960s, as the price of silver rose, Treasury Department vaults were depleted of silver dollars by the public. No silver dollars had been minted in the United States since 1935, and a shortage developed in the Western United States, especially in areas in which gambling was common. As a result, Congress voted to authorize the production of 45 million new silver Peace dollars on August 3, 1964. However, the move drew strong condemnation from critics and the public who believed that the issuance of the coins was a waste of resources and influenced by special interests, and that they would be quickly removed from circulation. A total of 316,076 1964-D Peace dollars were struck before production was ordered suspended. The coins were melted soon afterwards, and the Coinage Act of 1965, enacted on July 23, 1965, forbade all production of dollar coins for a period of five years.

On May 12, 1969, the Joint Commission on the Coinage, a panel of 24 individuals organized by the 1965 Coinage Act, recommended resumption of dollar coin production following a study conducted by a Congressional task force. On October 1 and 3, 1969, a hearing before the U.S. House of Representatives discussed the proposed legislation to authorize the coin, in a copper-nickel clad composition, with the 1.5-inch (38 mm) same diameter of the former silver dollars. A provision was added requiring the coin to depict former President Dwight D. Eisenhower, who had died earlier that year, on the obverse and a design "emblematic of the symbolic eagle of Apollo 11 landing on the moon" on the reverse. (Note: Gasparro's alternative design depicted a flying eagle, but after details were leaked to Congress, the bird was mandated to appear on the coin as it was depicted on the Apollo 11 insignia.) President Richard Nixon signed the bill into law on December 31, 1970. Both the obverse and reverse designs were created by Frank Gasparro, the Chief Engraver of the United States Mint.

As with previous dollar coins, the new Eisenhower dollar proved unpopular with the public, and very few of the coins were found in circulation. In 1976, the Research Triangle Institute conducted a survey of United States coinage. Among other things, they recommended the half dollar coin, which by then saw declining use, be eliminated from production, and the size of the dollar be reduced. Their report read in part:

A conveniently-sized dollar coin would significantly broaden the capabilities of consumers for cash transactions, especially with machines. Members of the automatic merchandising industry have expressed a strong interest in a smaller dollar, indicating their willingness to adapt their machinery to its use.

Numismatic historian David L. Ganz suggested that Eisenhower, a Republican, was chosen as a means of balancing the half dollar, depicting Democrat John F. Kennedy. In a 1977 paper, he agreed with the findings of the institute, suggesting that both coins should be eliminated; the half dollar production ceased entirely, and the dollar replaced by one of smaller diameter and with a different design. Treasury officials desired the small dollar coin as a cost-saving measure; Mint director Stella Hackel estimated that replacing half of the issued one dollar bills with smaller one dollar coins would save $19 million ($93.8 million in 2025 adjusted for inflation) in annual production costs. (Note: Although dollar bills are less costly to print, a dollar coin is considerably more durable and requires much less frequent replacement.)

== Design history ==
=== Liberty design ===
The Mint began preparation for the reduced-diameter dollar coin in 1976. Although no legislation had yet been introduced, Treasury officials anticipated a positive reception from Congress, and the coin had near unanimous support from the Mint and the vending machine industry, an influential lobby in the area of coin design and creation. In 1977, Treasury Secretary Michael Blumenthal publicly endorsed a smaller dollar coin and suggested that an allegorical representation of Liberty would be a suitable subject for the coin.

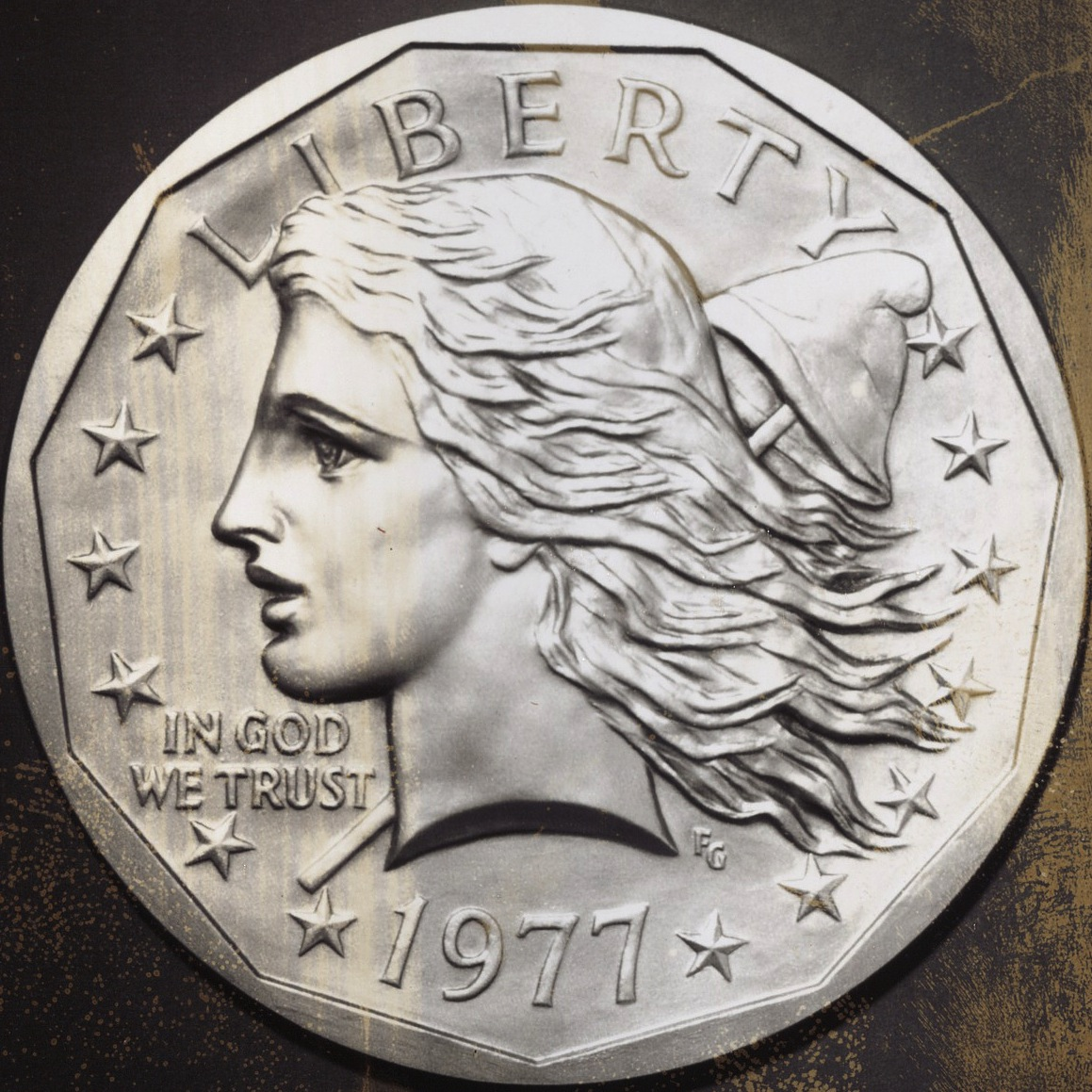
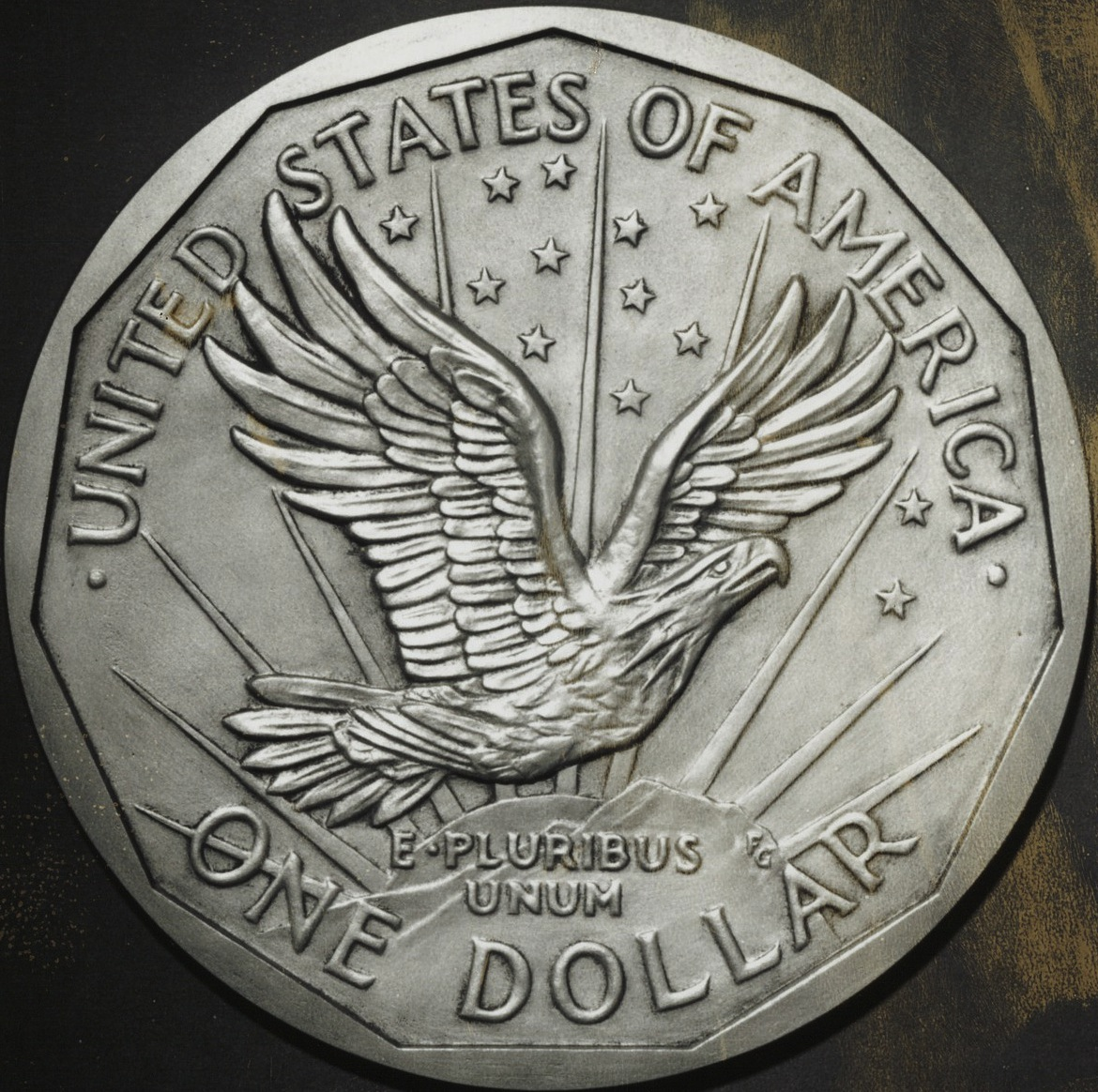
Gasparro's original design for the obverse and reverse of the coin which ultimately became the Susan B. Anthony dollar

Chief Engraver Gasparro was tasked with creating a design for the proposed coin. His obverse design depicted a bust of Liberty, while his reverse depicted a soaring eagle. The bust was pictured along with a pole, atop which sat a Phrygian cap, a symbol used to represent freedom. Gasparro's Liberty design was based on a similar obverse that he created for a 1969 American Numismatic Association convention medal. The reverse, depicting an eagle flying above a mountain against the rising Sun, was originally created by Gasparro in 1967 for a proposed commemorative half dollar. Describing the reverse design, Gasparro stated that it was meant to symbolize "a new day being born".

The design was reviewed by the Commission of Fine Arts, and in an April 29, 1976, letter, Commission member J. Carter Brown praised the design:

I believe this would be a superb design for United States Coinage, rooted as it is in a great tradition, being based on the 'Liberty Cap cent' of 1794, following Augustin Dupré's Libertas Americana medal commemorating Saratoga and Yorktown (1777–1781).

A bill to reduce the diameter of the dollar from 1.5 inches (38 mm) to 1.043 inches (26.5 mm) and the weight from 22.68 grams to 8.5 grams was introduced to the House of Representatives on May 1, 1978. The bill was introduced to the Senate on May 3, and the proposed weight was reduced from 8.5 grams to 8.1 grams. The Mint conducted experiments involving eight-, ten-, eleven- and thirteen-sided coins, but it was decided that the dollar would be round, as costly modifications would be required to update vending machinery to accept other shapes. Instead, the bill prescribed an eleven-sided inner border, which was intended to aid identification by sight and by feel for the visually handicapped.

=== Selection of Susan B. Anthony ===
Treasury officials officially recommended Gasparro's design, which they referred to as a "modernized version of the classic Liberty design". On May 3, 1978, Wisconsin's William Proxmire introduced legislation in the Senate which was identical to the Treasury proposal, except for mandating a design which was altered to social reformer Susan B. Anthony in place of the allegorical Liberty. On May 15, Representatives Mary Rose Oakar and Patricia Schroeder introduced similar legislation to the House of Representatives. Anthony was also recommended by members of the National Organization for Women, the Congresswomen's Caucus, the National Women's Political Caucus and the League of Women Voters. In support of the proposed legislation, the League addressed a letter to Walter E. Fauntroy, chairman of the Subcommittee on Historic Preservation and Coinage, reading in part:

The League believes that the time has come, and is indeed long past, for the likeness of a prominent American woman to be placed on a denomination of U.S. currency. We believe strongly that the likeness should be that of an actual woman and not that of an imaginary or symbolic figure. Susan B. Anthony contributed immeasurably to the advancement of human dignity in this nation. It is entirely fitting and appropriate that her memory be honored through this measure.

In addition, officials tallied suggestions sent to the Mint by the general public as to the subject of the dollar coin, and Susan B. Anthony had received the most support.

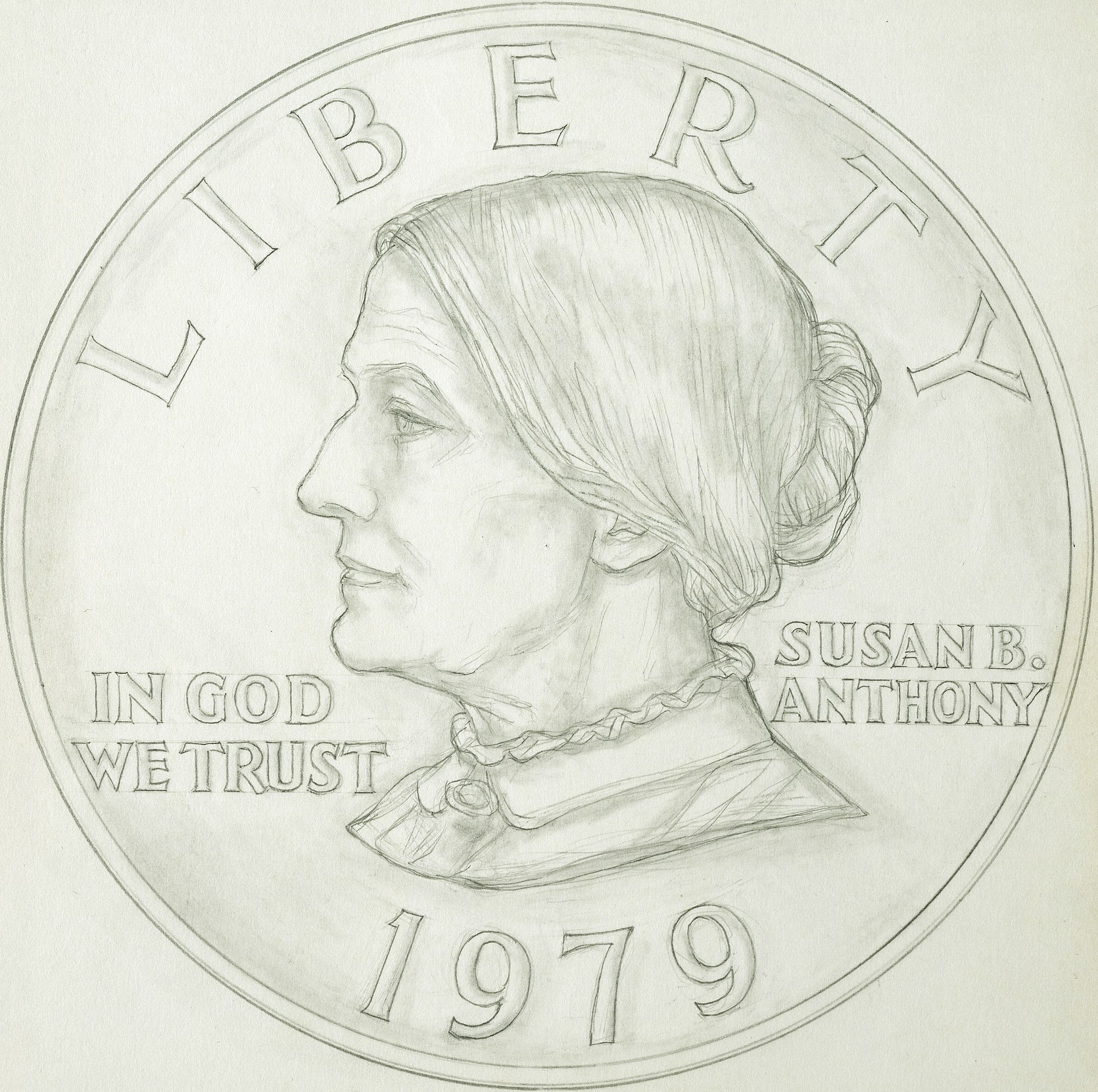
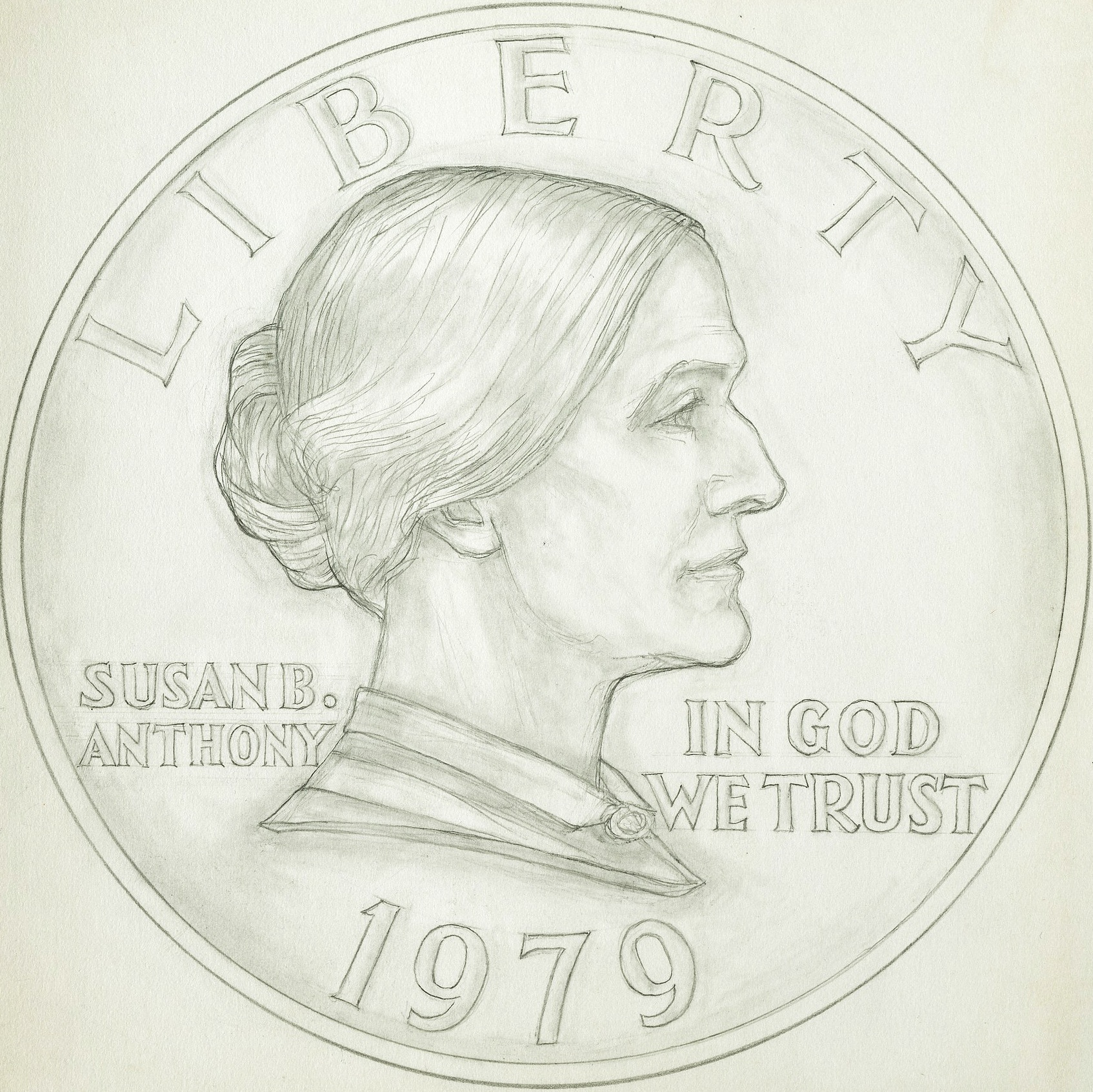
Two drawings created by Gasparro as proposed designs for the Susan B. Anthony dollar obverse

Gasparro began work on his Susan B. Anthony design in June 1978, before the legislation was authorized by Congress. He enlisted the help of a friend in conducting research on Anthony, which he felt was necessary before creating the design. He referenced approximately six different images while creating the portrait of Anthony, but it was based largely on just two. Gasparro created several different designs before receiving final approval. One of his portraits, depicting Anthony at age 28, was shown to Anthony's great-niece, Susan B. Anthony III, who rejected it on the grounds that it unnecessarily "prettified" her great-aunt, and she criticized another design depicting Anthony at age 84, which she believed made her appear too old. Gasparro made several alterations with the intent to depict her at age 50, at the peak of her influence as a social reformer, but no photographs of Anthony during that period are known to exist. He eventually received approval after modification, later stating his belief that he had accurately portrayed Anthony.

Initially, Gasparro expected that Congress would retain his soaring eagle reverse design to accompany the Susan B. Anthony obverse. However, a late amendment introduced by Utah Senator Jake Garn altered the legislation to maintain the Apollo 11 design in use on the Eisenhower dollar reverse.

The bill was approved by Congress and signed into law by President Jimmy Carter on October 10, 1978, and production of Eisenhower dollars ceased during that year. After he signed the bill into law, Carter issued a statement, saying in part that he was confident that "this act—and the new dollar—will substantially improve our coinage system as well as cutting Government coin production costs". He went on to declare his approval of the decision to depict Anthony on the coins:

I am particularly pleased that the new dollar coin will—for the first time in history—bear the image of a great American woman. The life of Susan B. Anthony exemplifies the ideals for which our country stands. The 'Anthony dollar' will symbolize for all American women the achievement of their unalienable right to vote. It will be a constant reminder of the continuing struggle for the equality of all Americans.

=== Design criticism ===
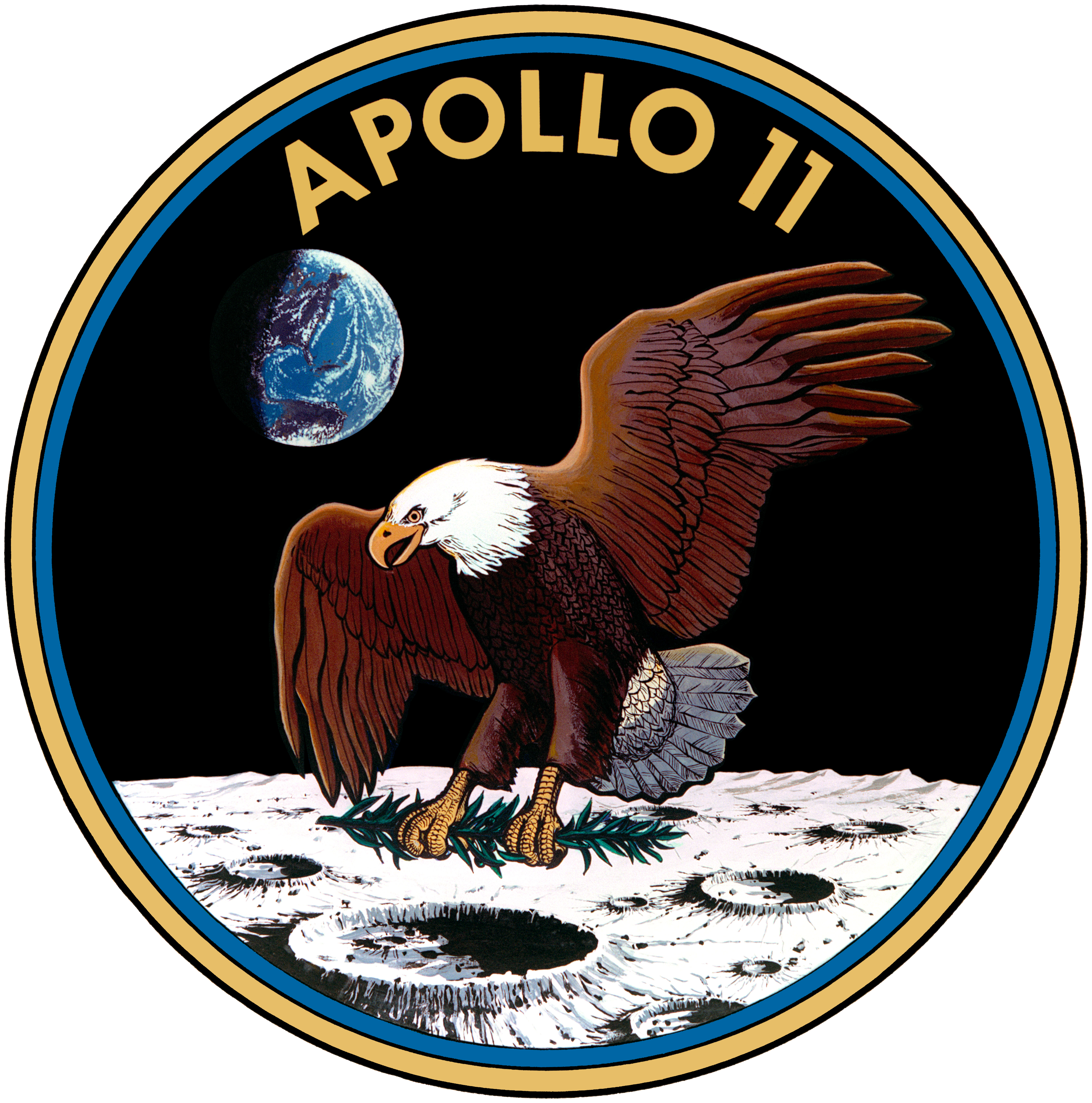
Numismatists criticized the pairing of Susan B. Anthony's portrait with a design based on the Apollo 11 insignia.

Gasparro regarded the Anthony design as the most important of his career. Remarking on the public perception of the coin, Gasparro related that "it's become part of a social movement. This new dollar's more than a coin; it's an issue." The decision to use a portrait of Susan B. Anthony in place of the allegorical Liberty was met with criticism by most numismatists, who believed that the Liberty design had far greater artistic merit. Art critic and numismatist Cornelius Vermeule was highly critical of the obverse design replacement, as well as the decision to continue use of the Apollo 11 design. Vermeule noted that although Eisenhower's administration established the National Aeronautics and Space Administration, Anthony had no connection to the Moon landing or the U.S. space program. Commenting on the obverse and reverse pairing, he stated his belief that it was "a hasty marriage and a bad one". Although he believed that Gasparro's Anthony design was well executed, sculptor Robert Weinman criticized the decision to depict Anthony. Concerned about the possibility of other groups seeking representation on the coinage in response to its passage, Weinman characterized the Susan B. Anthony dollar legislation as a "billboard or campaign button approach to a national coin".

== Reception ==
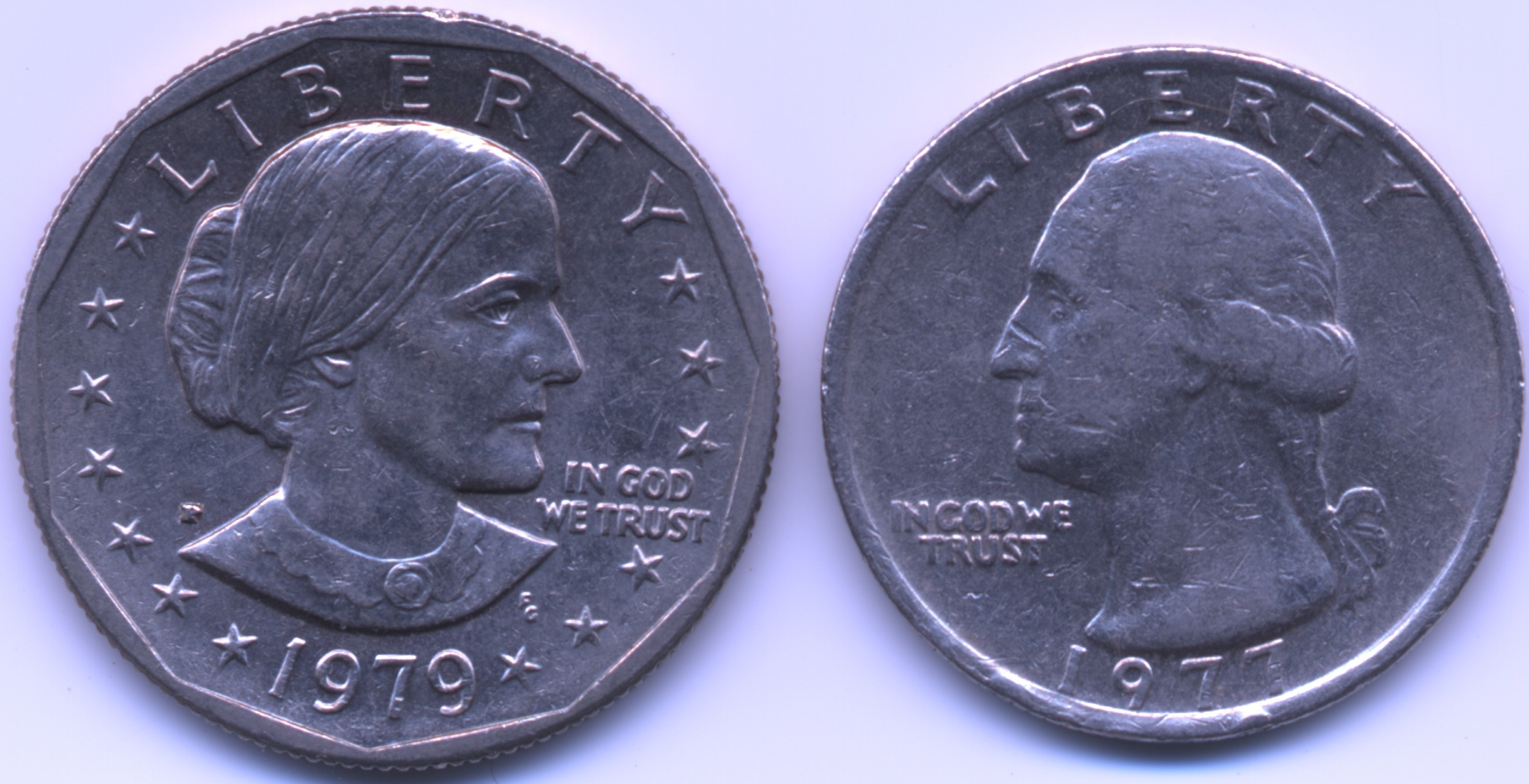
The similarity in size and material composition between the new Susan B. Anthony dollar (left) and the Washington quarter (right) caused immediate confusion in transactions.

The first Susan B. Anthony dollars were struck at the Philadelphia Mint on December 13, 1978. First strikes at the Denver and San Francisco Mints followed on January 9, 1979 and January 29, respectively. Mint officials feared that the coins would be hoarded upon release, so they ordered the creation of a stockpile consisting of 500 million coins prior to the release date on July 2, 1979. The dollars all bore a mint mark denoting their place of origin: 'P' for the Philadelphia Mint, 'D' for the Denver Mint and 'S' for the San Francisco Mint. The Anthony dollar was the first coin to bear a 'P' mint mark since the Jefferson nickel issued during World War II; other coins struck there were left without a mint mark to note their place of origin. In 1980, the 'P' mint mark was added to all other circulating coins, except the cent, struck in Philadelphia.

The Treasury Department, in cooperation with the Federal Reserve, undertook a $655,000 marketing campaign to educate bank employees and members of the public about the new coin, and the vending industry engaged in a $100 million effort to retrofit machines to accept the coins.

Despite the marketing attempts, the coin received an overwhelmingly negative reception from the public. In 1979, 66% of the national population disliked the coin. Less than two millimeters in diameter larger than the quarter and struck in the same copper-nickel composition, the Susan B. Anthony dollar was widely confused for that denomination in transactions. Mint Director Hackel noted the difference in weight and design between the two coins and expressed her belief that the dollar would eventually find favor with the public, suggesting that the coin would become "customary to the American people in time". In the months following its release, complaints mounted and public transportation and many establishments throughout the country began refusing to accept them in payment. On July 13, 1979, California Representative Jerry Lewis introduced a bill to the House of Representatives with the intent to increase the size of the coin to aid identification. Discussing the bill, which was never passed, Lewis remarked that the Anthony dollar had come to be known derisively as the "Carter quarter", due to its size and association with the President.

In total, 757,813,744 dollar coins dated 1979 were struck for circulation at the Philadelphia, Denver and San Francisco Mints. Demand remained low through 1980, and the circulation strikes for that year totaled 89,660,708. Due to its persistent unpopularity, production of Anthony dollars for circulation was suspended, and 9,742,000 1981 dollars were struck across all three Mints exclusively for sale to collectors; this mintage marked the end of production. At the close of production, the Treasury encountered a dilemma: the Mint struck a large number of dollars in anticipation of great public demand, resulting in a surplus of 520,000,000 coins in 1981. Melting the coins was impractical; the cost of manufacture was approximately 2 cents, and the 98 cents earned from seignorage was applied to the national debt. Had the coins been melted, their seignorage would have been added to the debt. Accordingly, the coins were placed in government storage, to be dispensed as needed.

The coin's design did have repercussions north of the border; when Canada introduced its new one-dollar coin in 1987, its dimensions were made similar so that vending machine specifications could be common between the two nations.

When the Baltimore Metro opened in 1984, it used the Susan B. Anthony dollar coin as tokens with which to buy tickets. It became the largest single user of Susan B. Anthony dollar coins in its history.

== 1999 reissue ==
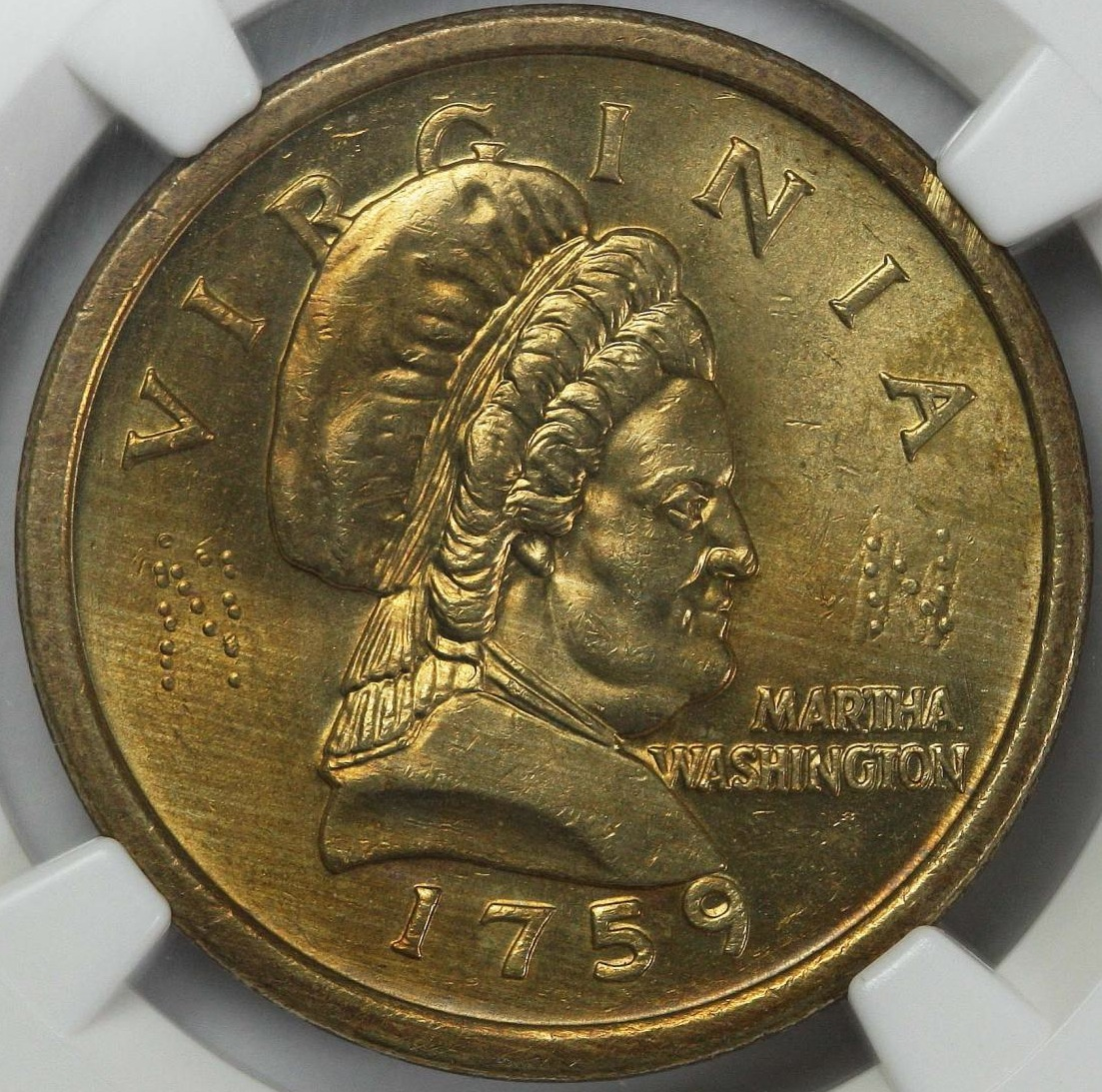
After passage of the United States $1 Coin Act of 1997, the Mint struck pattern coins, depicting Martha Washington and dated 1759, to test a more distinctive, gold-colored coin.

Despite their unpopularity in transactions, Anthony dollars began to see heavy use in over 9,000 stamp-dispensing machines situated in United States Postal Service buildings across the country beginning in the early 1990s. Additionally, the coins finally began to be used regularly with many mass-transit systems and vending-machine operations. Various propositions were discussed in Congress since the last dollars were produced in 1981, but no action was taken to issue a new coin until the Treasury's stores of Anthony dollars became depleted by the mid-1990s. In February 1996, the vaults totaled approximately 229,500,000 coins, but that number was reduced to approximately 133,000,000 by the end of 1997. Faced with the necessity of striking more Susan B. Anthony dollars to fill the demand, the Treasury supported legislation authorizing a new dollar coin that would not be confused with the quarter. Legislation authorizing a dollar coin in a gold-colored composition and with a plain edge was introduced to the House and Senate in 1997, where it eventually received approval with a provision calling for it to depict Native American guide Sacagawea. On December 1, 1997, President Bill Clinton signed the 50 States Commemorative Coin Program Act into law. The Act, which authorized the creation of the 50 State Quarters program, included a section entitled "United States $1 Coin Act of 1997". That section officially authorized what became the Sacagawea dollar.

Following passage of the act, a series of test strikes depicting Martha Washington were carried out to test various gold-colored alloys. Although the act provided for creation of a new gold-colored dollar, it also allowed for resumption of striking the Anthony design as a stopgap measure until production began on the new coins. Nearing depletion of Treasury stockpiles, on May 20, 1999, the U.S. Mint announced that production of the Susan B. Anthony dollar would resume. In total, 41,368,000 Anthony dollars dated 1999 were struck for circulation: 29,592,000 at the Philadelphia mint and 11,776,000 at the Denver mint. Proof strikes were carried out at the Philadelphia mint; no 1999 dollars were struck at the San Francisco mint. The Anthony design was officially retired in 2000, when the new Sacagawea dollar entered production.

== Collecting ==
As few Susan B. Anthony dollars circulated, many remain available in uncirculated condition and are worth little above face value. However, some date and mint mark varieties are relatively valuable. The 1981 coins, having been issued only to collectors, are valued above the other circulation strikes in the series. In addition, a well-known variety of the 1979 circulation strikes from Philadelphia, on which the date appears nearer to the rim, commands a higher price than the regular issue.

All dates of the dollar also exist in proof finish. The 1999 coins were sold as standalone proof strikes, rather than as part of a larger proof set, as the 1979, 1980, and 1981 issues were offered. The 1999 proof was minted exclusively at the Philadelphia Mint, and bears a "P" mint mark, while all other proof Anthony dollars were minted at San Francisco and bear the "S" of that Mint. Some 1979 and 1981 proofs bear a mint mark which was applied to the coinage dies with a different punch, causing them to have a more legible appearance. They are considered scarce and are valued considerably higher than normal proofs of the series.

== See also ==
- Apollo 11 in popular culture

== General bibliography ==
- Bailey, Clement F. (September 1974). "Ike's Dollar—The Successful Failure". COINage. 10 (11). Encino, California: Behn-Miller Publishers: 8–10, 94–100.
- Burdette, Roger W. (2005). Renaissance of American Coinage, 1916–1921. Great Falls, VA: Seneca Mill Press. ISBN 978-0-9768986-0-3.
- Carter, Jimmy (1979). Public Papers of the Presidents of the United States. Vol. Administration of Jimmy Carter. Washington, D.C.: Government Printing Office. ISBN 0-16-058934-7.
- Caskey, John P.; St. Laurent, Simon (August 1994). "The Susan B. Anthony Dollar and the Theory of Coin/Note Substitutions". Journal of Money, Credit and Banking. 26 (3). Columbus, Ohio: The Ohio State University Press: 495–510. doi:10.2307/2078014. JSTOR 2078014.(subscription required)
- Ganz, David L. (October 1976). "Our New Small-Size Dollar Coins". COINage. 12 (10). Encino, California: Behn-Miller Publishers: 54–58, 114–115.
- Ganz, David L. (1977). "Toward a Revision of the Minting and Coinage Laws of the United States". Cleveland State Law Review. 26. Cleveland State University: 175–257.
- Ganz, David L. (October 1979). "The Selling of a Coin". COINage. 13 (10). Encino, California: Behn-Miller Publishers: 44–46.
- Gilkes, Paul (June 2, 2008). "Die trials, experimentals, patterns test coin metals". Coin World. 49 (2512). Sidney, Ohio: Amos Press: 82–84.
- Hackel, Stella B. (1979). Annual Report of the Director of the Mint (Report). Washington, D.C.: Government Printing Office.
- Julian, R.W. (1993). Bowers, Q. David (ed.). Silver Dollars & Trade Dollars of the United States. Wolfeboro, New Hampshire: Bowers and Merena Galleries. ISBN 0-943161-48-7.
- Krause, Barry (June 1999). "Anthony dollar gaining respect". Coins. 46 (6). Iola, Wisconsin: Krause Publications: 64–65.
- Logan, Charles (July 1979). "The Search for a Dollar". COINage. 13 (7). Encino, California: Behin-Miller Publishers: 40–46.
- Logan, Charles (October 1979). "The Anthony—Who Goofed?". COINage. 13 (10). Encinco, California: Behn-Miller Publishers: 42, 101.
- Martin, Erik (June 7, 2010). "Anthony dollar hits wrong chord with collectors, public". Coin World. 51 (2617). Sidney, Ohio: Amos Press: 224–226.
- Reiter, Ed (February 1979). "Gasparro's Greatest Challenge". Coins. 26 (2). Iola, Wisconsin: Krause Publications: 116–117.
- Reiter, Ed (April 1979). "Judging the Anthony Dollar". COINage. 13 (4). Encino, California: Behn-Miller Publishers: 46–50.
- Reiter, Ed (October 11, 1981). "Numismatics; What Will Become of Those Anthony Dollars?". New York Times.
- Roach, Steve (March 8, 2010). "Wanted: new $1 coins (as long as they're not Anthony dollars)". Coin World. 51 (2604). Sidney, Ohio: Amos Press: 22–24.
- Schwager, David (August 2014). "The Anthony Dollar 'Orphan'". COINage. 50 (8). Dallas, Texas: Beckett Media: 60–61.
- Stevens, Larry; Ganz, David L. (February 1979). "Minting the Anthony Dollar". COINage. 13 (2). Encino, California: Behn-Miller Publishers: 33–35, 104.
- Stevenson, I.K. (December 13, 1964). "Date on New Silver Dollar Uncertain". Sarasota Herald-Tribune.
- The San Bernardino County Sun (July 15, 1979). "Lewis—dump new dollar coin". The San Bernardino Sun – via Newspapers.com.
- United States Congress (July 23, 1965). "Public Law 89–81" (PDF) (PDF).
- United States Congress (December 31, 1970). "Public Law 91–607" (PDF) (PDF).
- United States Congress (October 10, 1978). "Public Law 95–447" (PDF) (PDF).
- United States Congress (December 1, 1997). "Public Law 105–124" (PDF) (PDF).
- United States Department of the Treasury (February 29, 1968). "The Joint Commission on the Coinage" (PDF) (PDF). Archived from the original (PDF) on April 24, 2015.
- United States House of Representatives (1969). The Coinage Act of 1969. Washington, D.C.: Government Printing Office.
- United States House of Representatives (1978). Proposed Smaller One-Dollar Coin. Washington, D.C.: Government Printing Office.
- United States House of Representatives (1970). H.R. 4783. Washington, D.C.: Government Printing Office.
- United States Mint (May 20, 1999). "U.S. Mint to Strike 1999 Susan B. Anthony Dollar Coins" (Press release). Archived from the original on August 10, 2014.
- United States Senate (1978). The Susan B. Anthony Dollar Coin Act of 1978. Washington, D.C.: Government Printing Office.
- United States Senate (1978). Susan B. Anthony Dollar Coin Act of 1978. Washington, D.C.: Government Printing Office.
- Wolenik, Robert, ed. (August 1979). "First Check-Up on the Anthony Dollar". COINage. 13 (9). Encino, California: Behn-Miller Publishers: 8.
- Woo, Elaine (October 3, 2001). "Frank Gasparro, 92; Chief Engraver at U.S. Mint". Los Angeles Times.
- Yeoman, R.S. (2008). Kenneth Bressett (ed.). A Guide Book of United States Coins (62nd ed.). Atlanta, Georgia: Whitman Publishing. ISBN 978-079482491-4.

| Preceded by Eisenhower dollar | Dollar coin of the United States; 1979–1981, 1999 | Succeeded by Sacagawea dollar |
