= Frank Gasparro =

American engraver (1909–2001)

- Born: Frank Gasparro; August 26, 1909; Philadelphia, Pennsylvania, U.S.
- Died: September 29, 2001 (aged 92); Havertown, Pennsylvania
- Education: Pennsylvania Academy of the Fine Arts
- Occupation: Sculptor
- Notable work: Susan B. Anthony Dollar, Lady Liberty Coin
- Children: 2

Frank Gasparro (August 26, 1909 – September 29, 2001) was the tenth Chief Engraver of the United States Mint, holding this position from February 23, 1965, to January 16, 1981. Before that, he was Assistant Engraver. He designed both sides of the Susan B. Anthony dollar, both sides of the Eisenhower Dollar (with the exception of the Bicentennial issues of 1975–1976), the Lincoln Memorial reverse of the cent (minted from 1959 to 2008), and the reverse of the Kennedy half dollar.

== Birth and early life ==
Gasparro was born in Philadelphia on August 26, 1909. His musician father wanted his son to continue in the family profession and would rip up drawings he made out of frustration. His father ultimately relented and had Gasparro apprentice under sculptor Giuseppe Donato, who had earlier worked for Auguste Rodin. Gasparro graduated from South Philadelphia High School in 1927 and has been inducted into the SPHS Alumni Cultural Hall of Fame. He attended the Pennsylvania Academy of the Fine Arts and traveled to Europe with the aid of scholarships that allowed him to refine his craft.

== Mint career ==
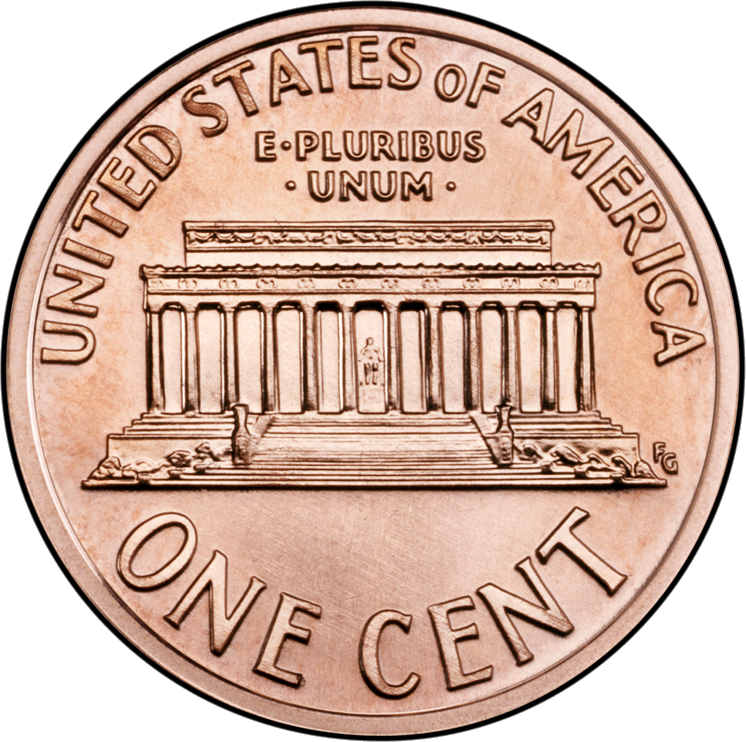
Image of the reverse of the Lincoln cent used from 1959 to 2008, showing the Lincoln memorial with Lincoln seated at the center and Gasparro's initials to the right of the monument.

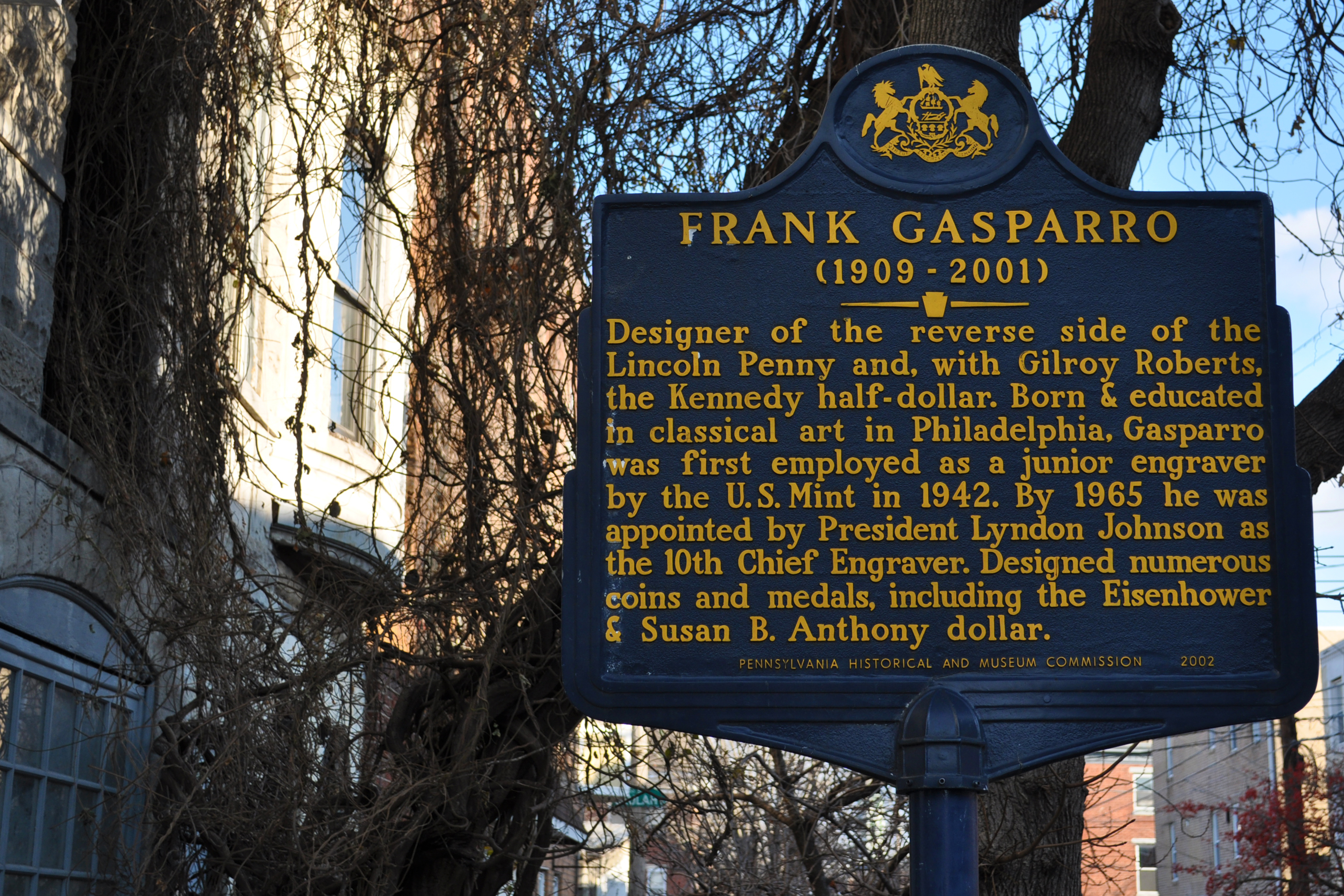
Frank Gasparro Historical Marker

Gasparro was hired by the United States Mint in December 1942 under Chief Engraver John R. Sinnock. Gasparro's first major successful coin design was his redesign of the reverse of the Lincoln cent as part of the 150th anniversary of the birth of Abraham Lincoln, while he was Assistant Engraver at the Philadelphia Mint. Gasparro's design was selected from a group of 23 designs prepared by the Mint's engraving staff to replace the Wheat cent produced by the Mint from 1909 to 1958. His original design included the words "Lincoln Memorial" and 13 stars around the rim of the coin, which he removed at the request of staff at the Mint. Despite the complaints of his superiors, the design retained his initials to the right of the monument as well as the image of Lincoln seated in the monument, making it the first American coin to have the same likeness on both sides of the coin. Gasparro would often tell cashiers that he was a sculptor, and when asked where to find his work, he would reply, "It's in your pocket." By the time of his death, Gasparro's design had appeared on the more than 100 billion pennies produced by the Mint.

Eisenhower dollar engraved by Gasparro.
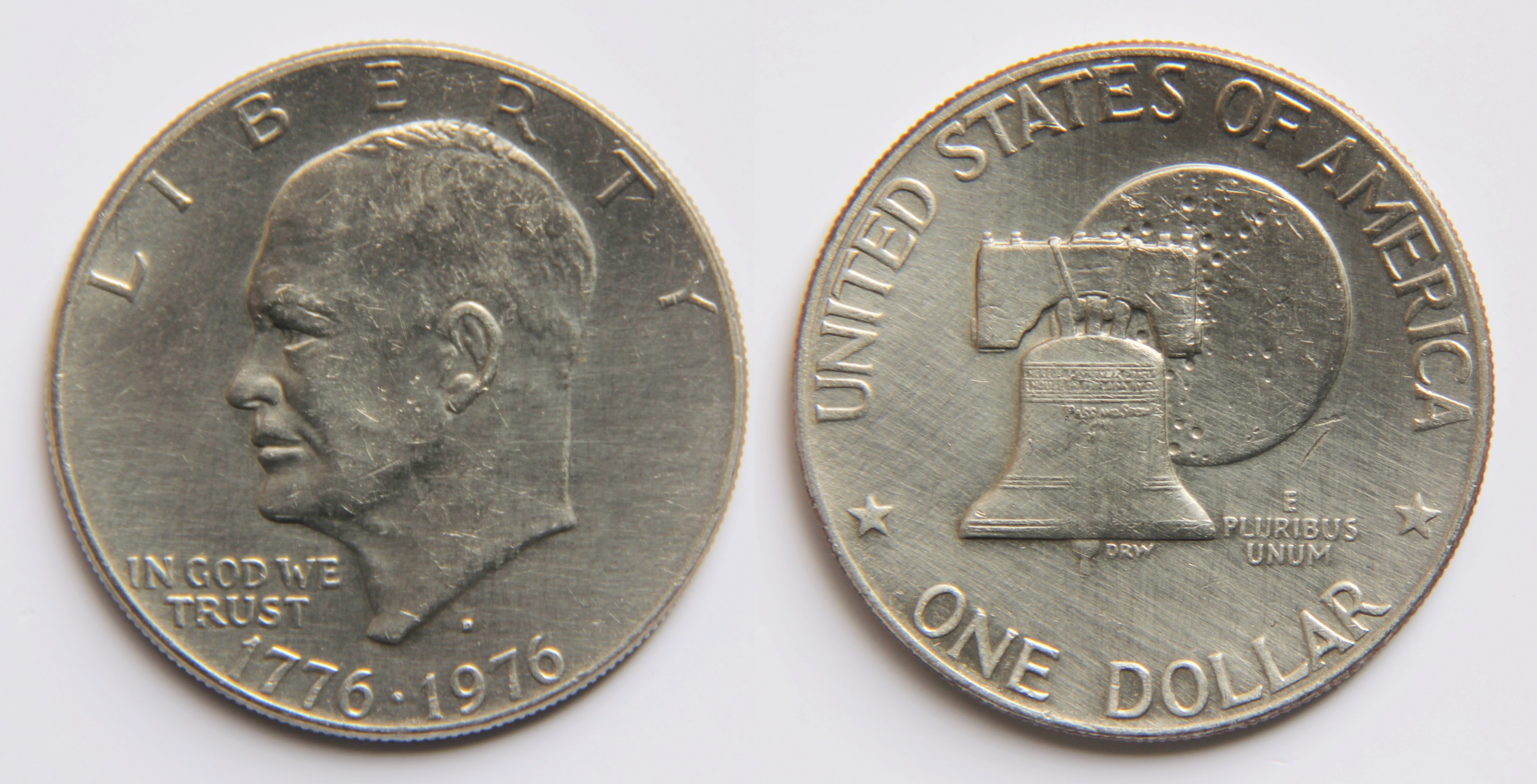
First side of the image: Obverse: Eisenhower portrait, US national motto, Liberty on top, US Independence year (1776) and year of minting (1976).
Second side of the image: Reverse: Liberty Bell in front of the Moon, country name, face value and E pluribus unum (Out of many, one).
Only the obverse of this coin was engraved by Gasparro. The reverse was engraved by Dennis R. Williams.

=== The Susan B. Anthony dollar ===
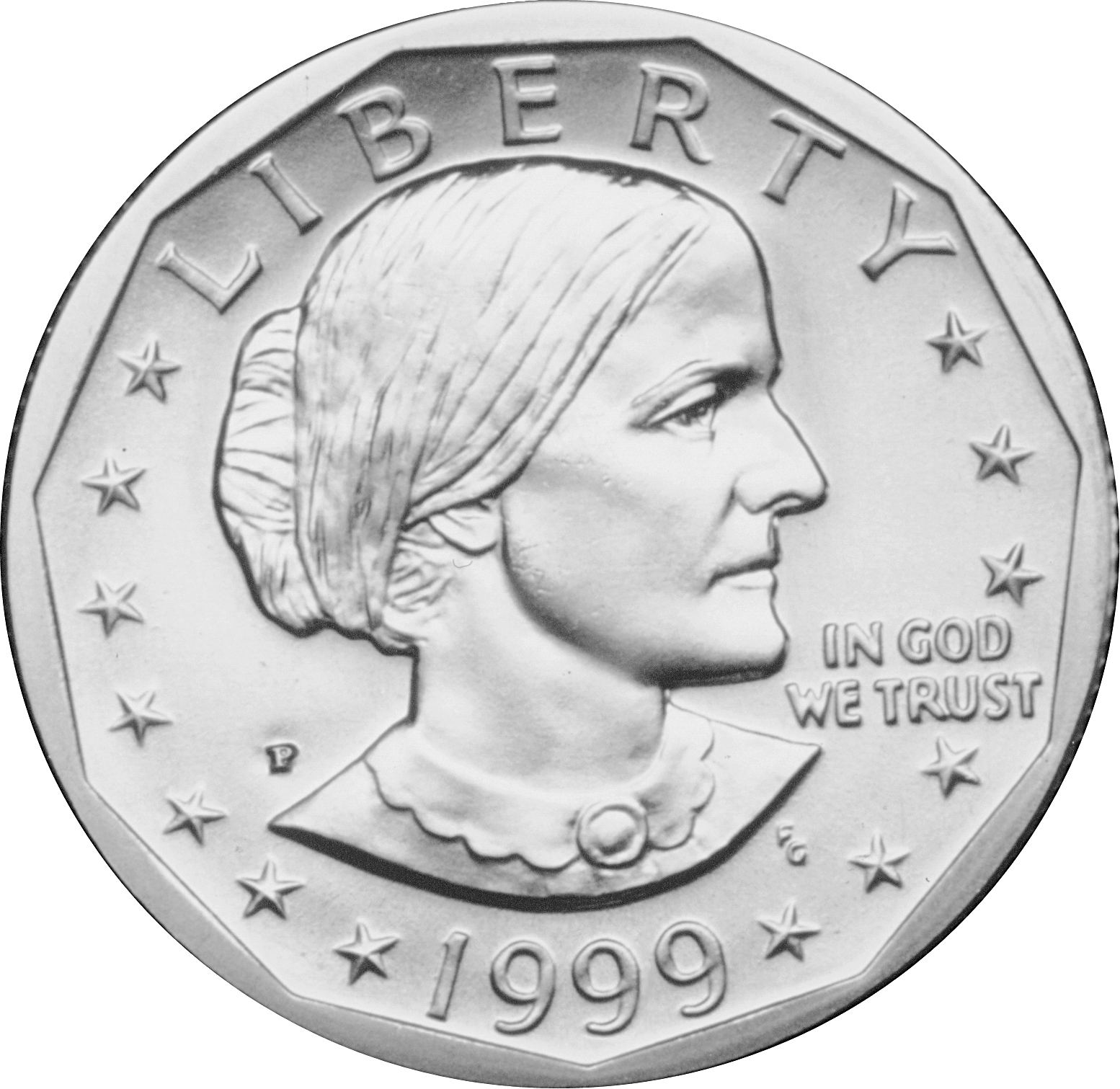
Gasparro designed both the obverse (pictured) and reverse of the Susan B. Anthony dollar, which he called his "top achievement", though the coin was largely rejected by the American public

Asked to produce a design for the Susan B. Anthony dollar, Gasparro found two photos of women's suffrage leader, one at age 28 and the other when she was 84. He initially chose the portrait of the younger Anthony, but widespread consensus was that the design made her look too pretty. His design using the older photo was accepted. While Gasparro felt that the Anthony dollar was his "top achievement", the coin was largely rejected by the public, which complained that the coin was too similar to the Washington Quarter.

As the Mint's Chief Engraver from 1965 to 1981, Gasparro also created designs for the reverse of the Kennedy half dollar, for which he took painstaking attention to the details of the design of the seal of the president of the United States, making the words "E pluribus unum" more prominent. Other designs by Gasparro included medals for Winston Churchill, Albert Gallatin, Douglas MacArthur, and Sam Rayburn, along with the presidential medals for all Presidents from Lyndon B. Johnson to Ronald Reagan and numerous foreign coins produced by the Mint. One of his best known works was the obverse of the Congressional gold medal for John Wayne, widely bought by the public in bronze.

== Technique ==
Gasparro designed his coins by finding subjects, such as objects, animals, and people from various newspaper clippings, photographs, magazines, and books. Most of his sketches are based on one of two designs – Lady Liberty or eagles and each sketch was different from the last. He used a Xerox copier to copy photos, tracing paper to trace the shape, and transferred his designs to sketch paper. From there, he continued to make more sketches based on his subjects, and with each of them, added certain features, such as crowns, helmets, arrows, etc to the subject. Then a final sketch of the design would be created to serve as a reference to the mold.

== Later life ==
After his retirement from the mint he continued to design medals for both private and public groups. He also taught art at Philadelphia's Samuel S. Fleisher Art Memorial until shortly before his death.

Gasparro died at age 92 on September 29, 2001, in Havertown, Pennsylvania. He was survived by his wife, Julia, and a daughter.

Government offices
Preceded by Gilroy Roberts	Chief Engraver of the U.S. Mint; 1965–1981	Succeeded by Elizabeth Jones
