= Seth G. Huntington =

American artist and sculptor (1920–2021)

Seth George Huntington (February 12, 1920 – November 3, 2021) was an American artist and sculptor. He designed the reverse of the 1975–1976 Bicentennial Kennedy half dollar. Huntington died on November 3, 2021, at the age of 101.
