= Kennedy half dollar =

50-cent piece depicting John F Kennedy minted after his assassination in 1963

- United States
- Value: 50 cents (.50 US dollar)
- Mass: 1971–current: 11.34 g. 1965–1970: 11.50 g. 1964: 12.50 g
- Diameter: 30.6 mm
- Thickness: 2.15 mm
- Edge: reeded
- Composition: Outer layer of 75% copper, 25% nickel clad to pure copper core. 1965–1970: outer layer of 80% silver, 20% copper clad to core of 79% copper, 21% silver; totaling 60% copper, 40% silver. 1964: 90% silver, 10% copper
- Gold: 2014 commemorative version: 0.999 fine gold, 0.75 troy oz
- Silver: Silver collectors' versions: 1976: 40% fine, 0.37 troy oz. Silver proofs 1992–2018: 90% fine, 0.402 troy oz. Silver proofs since 2019: 99.9% fine, 0.37 troy oz
- Years of minting: 1964–present
- Mint marks: P, D, S, W. "W" mint mark only on 2014 commemorative issue. Mint mark located beneath where the eagle's claws grasp the olive branch on reverse for 1964 coins and for 1964-2014-W gold issue; above the date on the obverse for all other issues. Mint mark omitted on all coins from 1965 to 1967 and on Philadelphia Mint issues before 1980.

Obverse
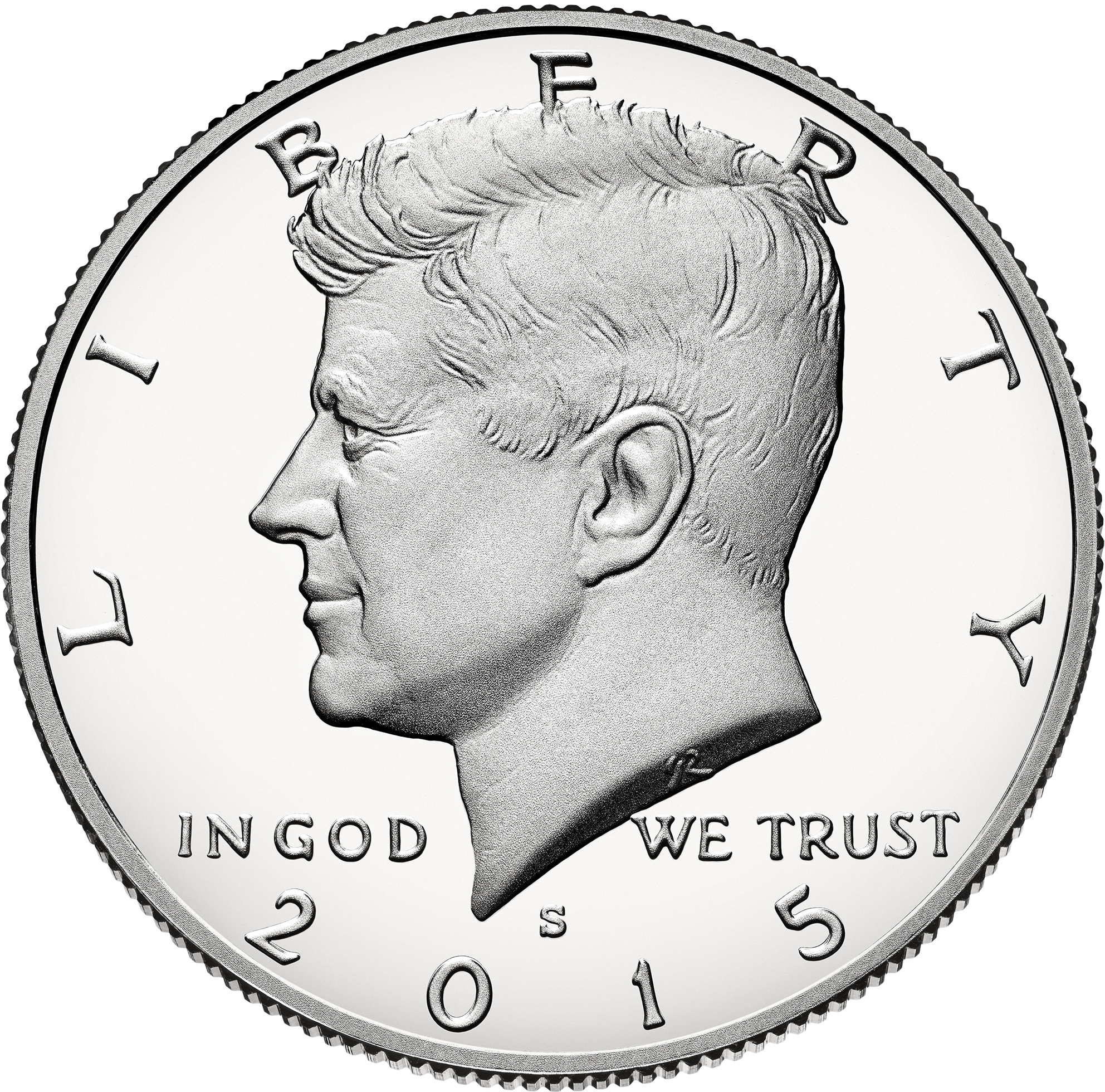
- Design: Left profile of John F. Kennedy
- Designer: Gilroy Roberts
- Design date: 1964 to present

Reverse
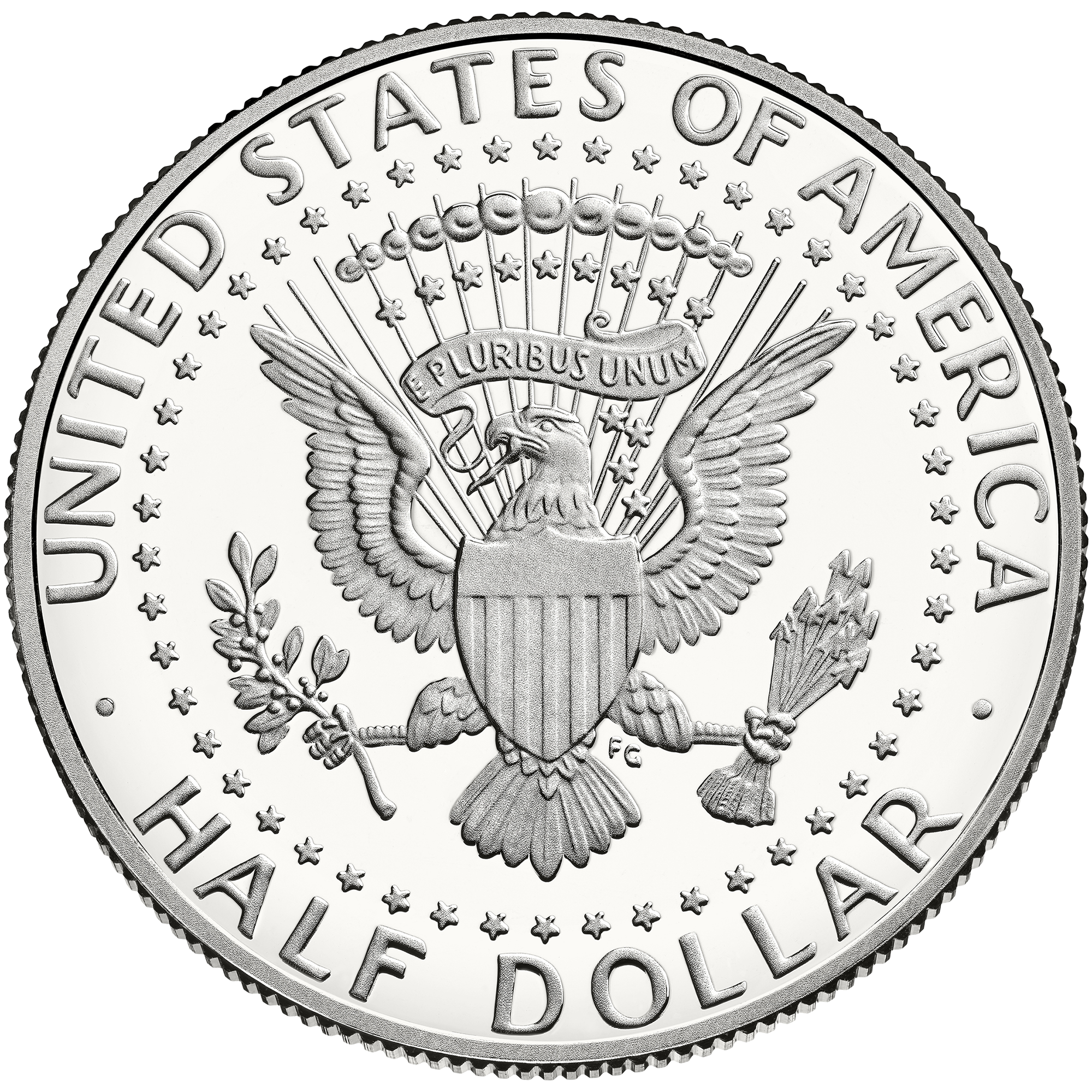
- Design: Modified presidential seal
- Designer: Frank Gasparro
- Design date: 1964 to present, excepting 1975 and 1976
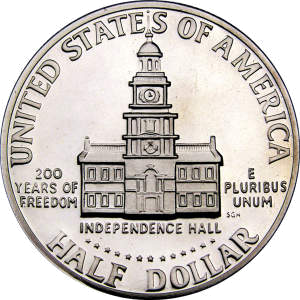
- Design: Independence Hall
- Designer: Seth G. Huntington
- Design date: 1975 and 1976 (dated 1776–1976)

The Kennedy half dollar, first minted in 1964, is a fifty-cent coin issued by the United States Mint. Intended as a memorial to the assassinated 35th president of the United States John F. Kennedy, it was authorized by Congress just over a month after his death. Use of existing works by Mint sculptors Gilroy Roberts and Frank Gasparro allowed dies to be prepared quickly, and striking of the new coins began in January 1964.

The silver coins were hoarded upon their release in March 1964 by collectors and those interested in a memento of the late president. Although the Mint greatly increased production, the denomination was seldom seen in circulation. Continued rises in the price of silver increased the hoarding—many early Kennedy half dollars have been melted for their silver content. Starting with 1965-dated coins, the percentage of fine silver was reduced from 90% to 40% (silver clad), but even with this change the coin saw little circulation.

In 1971, silver was eliminated entirely from the half dollar. Though production increased, the clad coin saw only a moderate increase in circulation; by 1980, usage had gradually fallen to the point where the half was only occasionally seen in circulation. A special design for the reverse of the half dollar was issued for the United States Bicentennial and was struck in 1975 and 1976. In addition to business strikes, special collector coins were struck for the Bicentennial in silver clad; silver proof sets in which the dime, quarter and half dollar were struck in 90% silver were minted from 1992 to 2018. In 2014, a special 50th anniversary edition of the Kennedy half dollar was also struck in 99.99% gold. Beginning in 2019, silver coins for collectors, including silver Kennedy half dollars, were minted in 99.9% silver.

Even though ample supplies of circulating half dollars are readily available from most banks, their circulation is still limited. Production of Kennedy half dollars for general circulation was temporarily suspended in 2001; from 2002 to 2020, the coins were produced to satisfy the demand from collectors and sold at a premium through the Mint. In 2021, the mint resumed striking Kennedy half dollars for general circulation.

== Inception ==
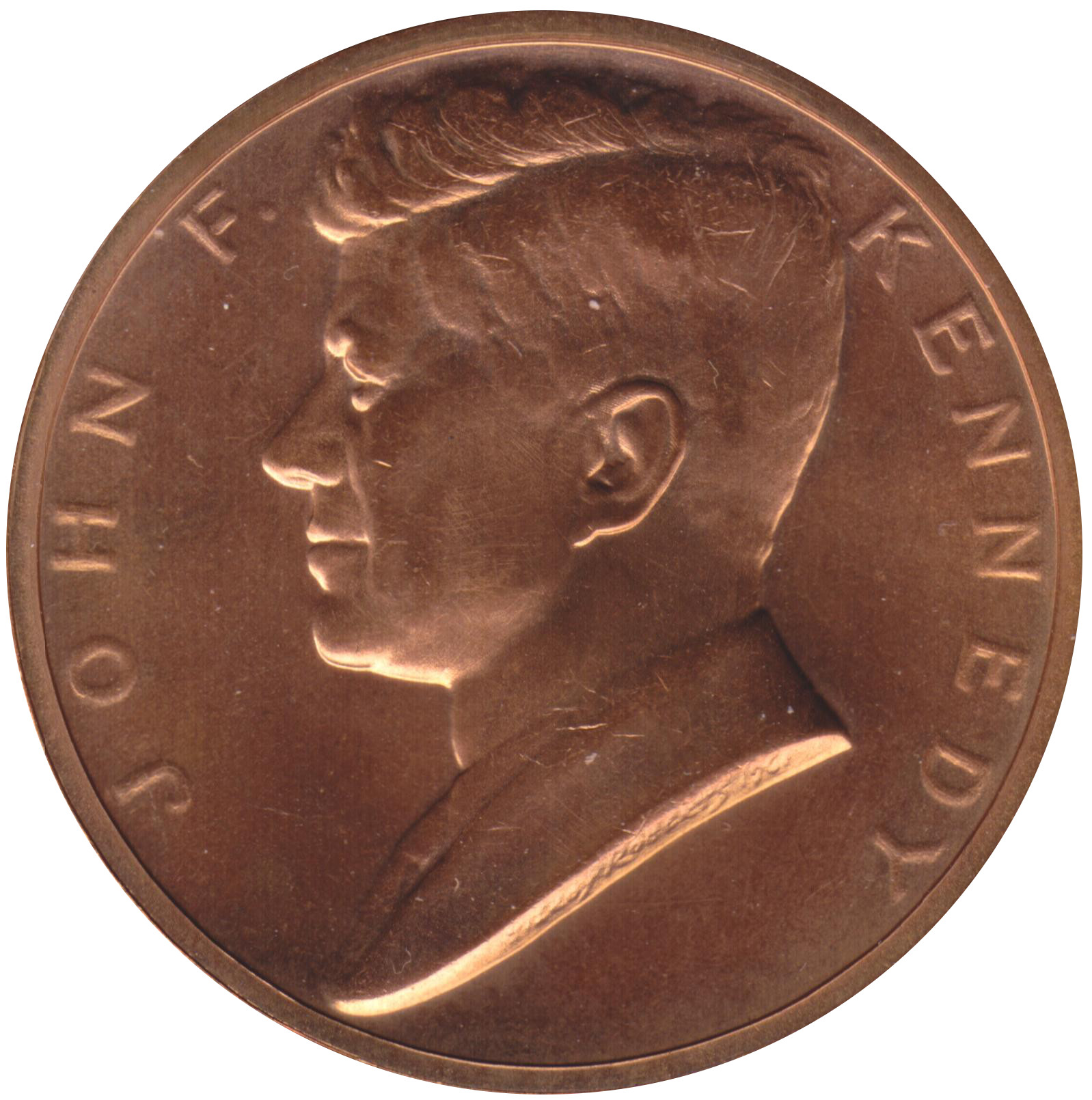
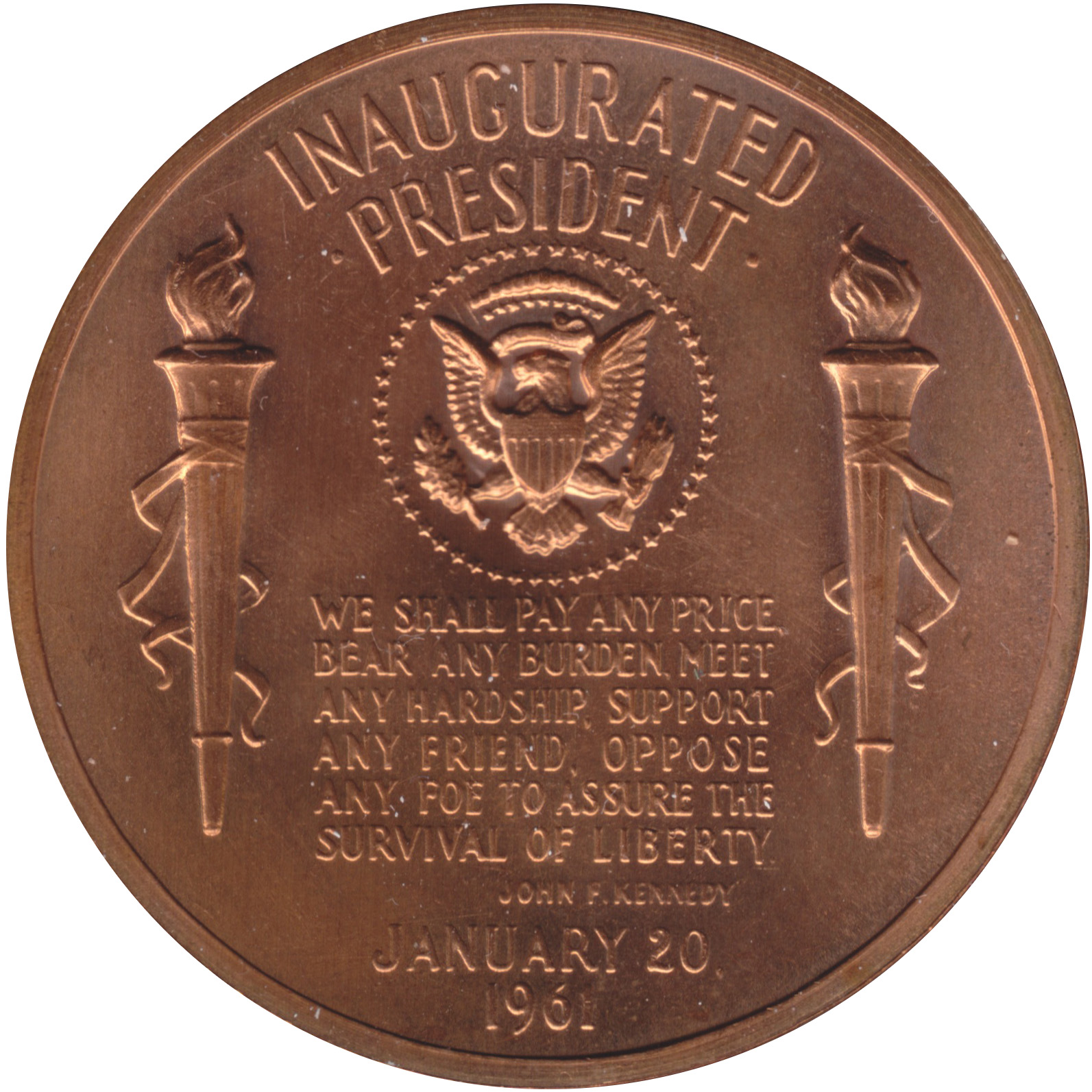
Gilroy Roberts' obverse (top) and Frank Gasparro's reverse (bottom) of the John F. Kennedy Presidential series medal served as the basis for the designs of the Kennedy half dollar.

Within hours of the assassination of John F. Kennedy on November 22, 1963, Mint Director Eva Adams called Chief Engraver Gilroy Roberts, informing him that serious consideration was already being given to depicting Kennedy on one of the larger silver coins: either the silver dollar, half dollar, or quarter dollar. Adams called Roberts again on November 27 and authorized the project, stating that the late president's widow, Jacqueline Kennedy preferred that he be depicted on the half dollar, replacing the previous design of Benjamin Franklin. Mrs. Kennedy's reasoning was that she did not want to replace George Washington on the quarter.

In the interest of time (the striking of the new coin was to begin in January 1964), Roberts modified the existing bust of Kennedy he had created for use on the Kennedy medal in the Mint's Presidential series, while Frank Gasparro began modifications to the reverse he had created for the same medal. Both Roberts' and Gasparro's designs had been approved by Kennedy. Roberts had met with Kennedy in person to show him early models of the design; although the President expressed no opinion regarding the depiction, Roberts decided to make some changes after meeting him. After the Mint produced trial strikes, Jacqueline and Robert F. Kennedy were invited to view them. Mrs. Kennedy viewed the designs favorably, but suggested that the hair be altered slightly. It was also suggested that a full or half figure of the president be used instead of the profile, but Roberts noted that there was not enough time to produce an entirely new design because of the project's time constraints, and also that he believed the left profile would give a more attractive appearance.

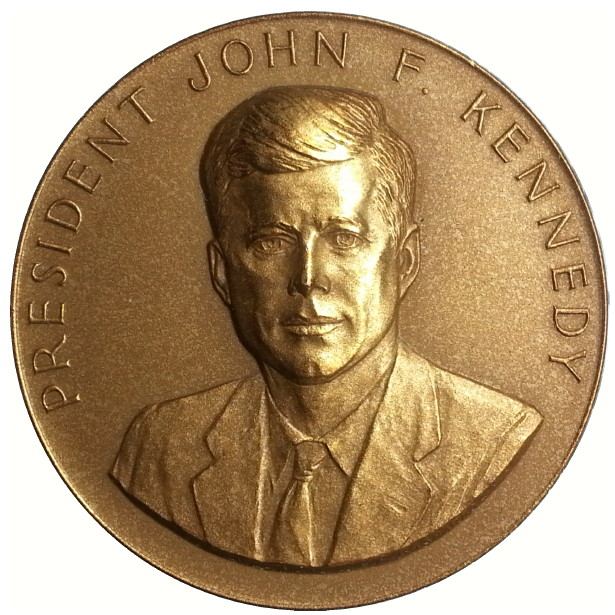
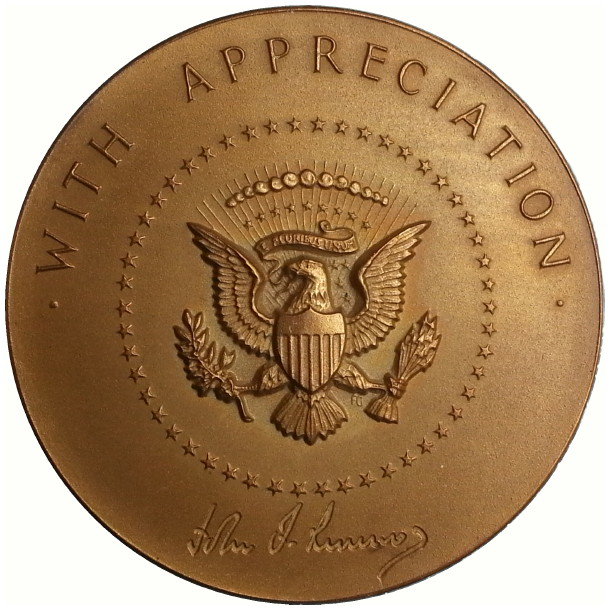
Frank Gasparro's obverse (top) and reverse (bottom) of the 1962 President John F. Kennedy appreciation medal

Frank Gasparro's reverse design of the Kennedy half dollar was also influenced by the experience he gained from designing the President John. F. Kennedy appreciation medal. In 1962, President Kennedy had three hundred appreciation medals struck by the United States Mint in Philadelphia that were later presented during his June 23, 1963 through July 2, 1963 trip to the nations of Federal Republic of Germany, Germany (West Berlin), Ireland, United Kingdom, Italy, and the Vatican City State. The reverse design of the Kennedy appreciation medal depicts a larger and more detailed Presidential Seal than the one he designed on the Mint's Presidential series (Bureau of the Mint Presidential series stock medal #135 known as the John F. Kennedy Presidential inauguration medal). Gasparro's placement of his initials FG is also similarly located (under the right leg of the eagle) on both the Kennedy appreciation medal and Kennedy half dollar.

Congressional approval was required for any design change within 25 years of the last. In early December, Representative Henry Gonzalez (Democrat-Texas) introduced a bill for Kennedy to appear on the half dollar. On December 10, the new President, Lyndon Johnson, endorsed the call for a Kennedy half dollar, asking Congress to pass the legislation promptly to allow striking of the new piece to begin early in 1964. President Johnson stated that he had been moved by letters from many members of the public to agree with the plan. The bill to authorize the Kennedy half dollar passed on December 30, 1963. Work was already underway on coinage dies; the use of the already-available designs allowed for the completion of the first dies on January 2, 1964. Only proof coins were initially struck. The first Kennedy half dollars intended for circulation were struck at the Denver Mint on January 30, 1964, followed by the Philadelphia Mint the next week. A ceremonial first strike was held at both Philadelphia and Denver on February 11, 1964.

== Release ==
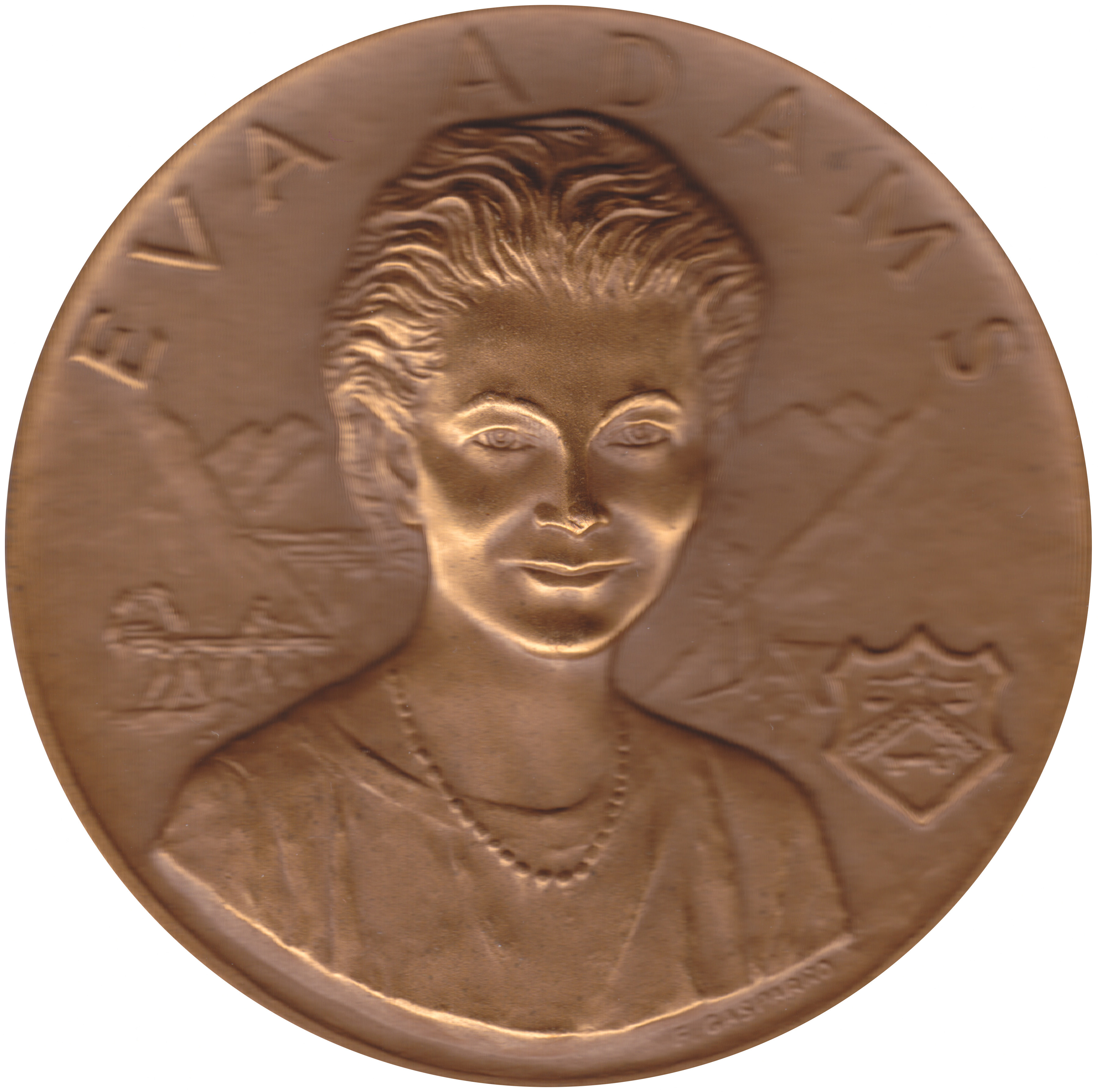
Mint Director Eva Adams, seen here on her medal (designed by Gasparro) was instrumental in the issuance of the Kennedy half dollar.

=== Initial popularity ===
The Treasury Department made the coins available to the public beginning on March 24, 1964. A line a block long formed at the department's windows in Washington to purchase the 70,000 coins initially allocated for public sale. Although the department limited sales to 40 per customer, by the end of the day, the coins were gone, but the line had not shortened. Banks in Boston and Philadelphia quickly rationed supplies, but still sold out by noon. Sales in New York did not begin until the following day, and rationing was imposed there as well, to the disgruntlement of the head of the coin department at Gimbels, the largest dealer in the city, which had hoped to sell the coins at a premium.

The coins were popular overseas as well. U.S. Assistant Secretary of State for African Affairs G. Mennen Williams distributed plastic-encased specimens to presidents and foreign ministers of African nations and to the U.S. ambassadors serving there "to win friends for the United States in Africa". Shortly after the coin's release, the Denver Mint began receiving complaints that the new coin depicted a hammer and sickle on the bottom of Kennedy's truncated bust. In response, Roberts stated that the portion of the design in question was actually his monogram, a stylized "GR".

The Mint struck Kennedy half dollars in large numbers in an attempt to meet the overwhelming demand. The Treasury had initially planned to issue 91 million half dollars for 1964, but raised the number to 141 million. However, a public announcement of the increase failed to cause more coins to actually circulate or to decrease the prices on the secondary market. By late November, the Mint had struck approximately 160 million pieces, yet the coin was almost never seen in circulation. Silver prices were rising, and the majority of the coins were being hoarded. Hopeful that issuing more 1964-dated coins would counter the speculation in them, the Treasury requested and received Congressional authorization to continue striking 1964-dated coins into 1965. Eventually, almost 430 million half dollars dated 1964 were struck, a sum greater than the total struck for circulation in the sixteen years of the Franklin half dollar series.

These minting operations were rapidly depleting the Treasury's stock of silver. Prices for the metal were rising to such an extent that, by early June, a dime contained 9.33 cents' worth of silver at market prices. On June 3, 1965, President Johnson announced plans to eliminate silver from the dime and quarter in favor of a clad sandwich with layers of copper-nickel on each side of a layer of pure copper. The half dollar was changed from 90% silver to 40%. Congress passed the Coinage Act of 1965 in July. The new half dollars retained their silvery appearance, due to the outer layer being 80% silver and 20% copper. The coin was also minted with an inner layer of 21% silver and 79% copper. The first silver-clad half dollars were struck at the Denver Mint on December 30, 1965, bearing the date 1965; the date would not be changed for all US coinage until the coin shortage was eased. Beginning on August 1, 1966, the Mint began to strike 1966-dated pieces, and thereafter it resumed the normal practice of striking the current year's date on each piece. Despite the proclaimed end to the coin shortage, Kennedy half dollars circulated little, a scarcity caused by continued hoarding and a dip in production, with the Treasury reluctant to expend more of the nation's silver holdings on a coin which did not circulate. According to coin dealer and numismatic author Q. David Bowers,

"Where the hundreds of millions of them went remains somewhat of a mystery today. In the meantime, Washington quarters, the same design used since 1932, became the highest value coin of the realm, in terms of circulation use. These were particularly popular for vending machines, arcade games, and the like. Today, this continues to be the case, and Kennedy half dollars as well as the later mini-dollar coins, are almost never encountered."

=== Switch to base metal ===
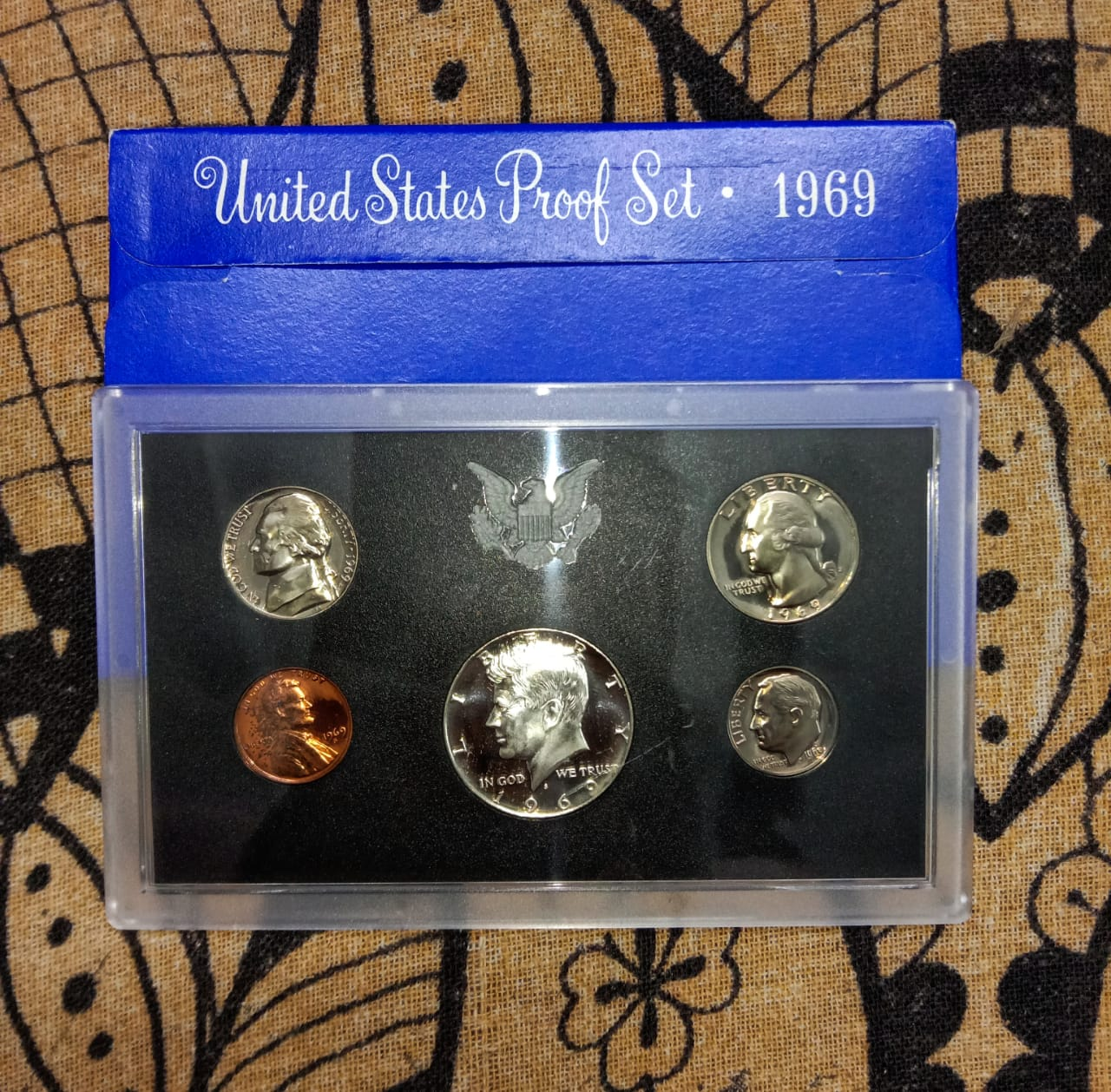
A 1969 United States Mint Proof set of 5 coins including the 40% silver Kennedy half dollar in center

In May 1969, the Treasury sought authorization to eliminate the half dollar's silver content, changing it to the same copper-nickel clad composition as the dime and quarter. The Treasury also sought approval to strike copper-nickel clad one dollar coins, which would fill a need for gaming tokens in Western casinos. Former president Dwight D. Eisenhower had died recently, and there was discussion of placing Eisenhower's likeness on the new dollar. The Treasury hoped that with the removal of the silver content, the dollar coin would cease to be hoarded and again circulate. Despite the support of President Richard Nixon, some Republicans in the House of Representatives initially scuttled the legislation, disliking the idea of depicting Eisenhower on a base metal coin. The dispute dragged on for over a year before President Nixon signed a bill on December 31, 1970 which authorized production of the Eisenhower dollar and eliminated the remaining 40% silver content from the half dollar. As a result of the delay, in 1970 uncirculated (non-proof) half dollars were struck only at the Denver mint and were available solely in mint sets. With a mintage of 2.1 million, the 1970-D Kennedy half is considered the "key" coin in the series, although enough were produced to keep prices modest. To avoid hoarding and a potential shortage of the sets, the Mint did not announce that no 1970 half dollars would be struck for circulation until after ordering for the mint sets had closed.

By the time silver was eliminated from the half dollar and the base metal coins were issued in 1971, it had rarely been seen in circulation for so long that some banks had eliminated the slot for the denomination from machines. The Mint had anticipated a dramatic comeback for the denomination, but only a moderate increase in the usage of half dollars was noted after the 1971 clad coins were issued. In July 1971, Mint Director Mary Brooks disclosed that the Treasury was holding 200 million of the new base metal half dollars, as commercial banks expressed little interest in ordering them. "I can't understand the population. They're not using them", Brooks said. Also according to Brooks, most of the over one billion silver Kennedy half dollars had been hoarded by the public. Brooks theorized that because the silver Kennedy half dollar never circulated much and few halves were struck in 1970 in anticipation of the authorization of the new clad coins, the public had become accustomed to not seeing the half dollar in trade. Brooks suggested, "If the country knew there were plenty of them around, they'd probably start hoarding them, too."

=== Bicentennial issue (1975–1976) ===
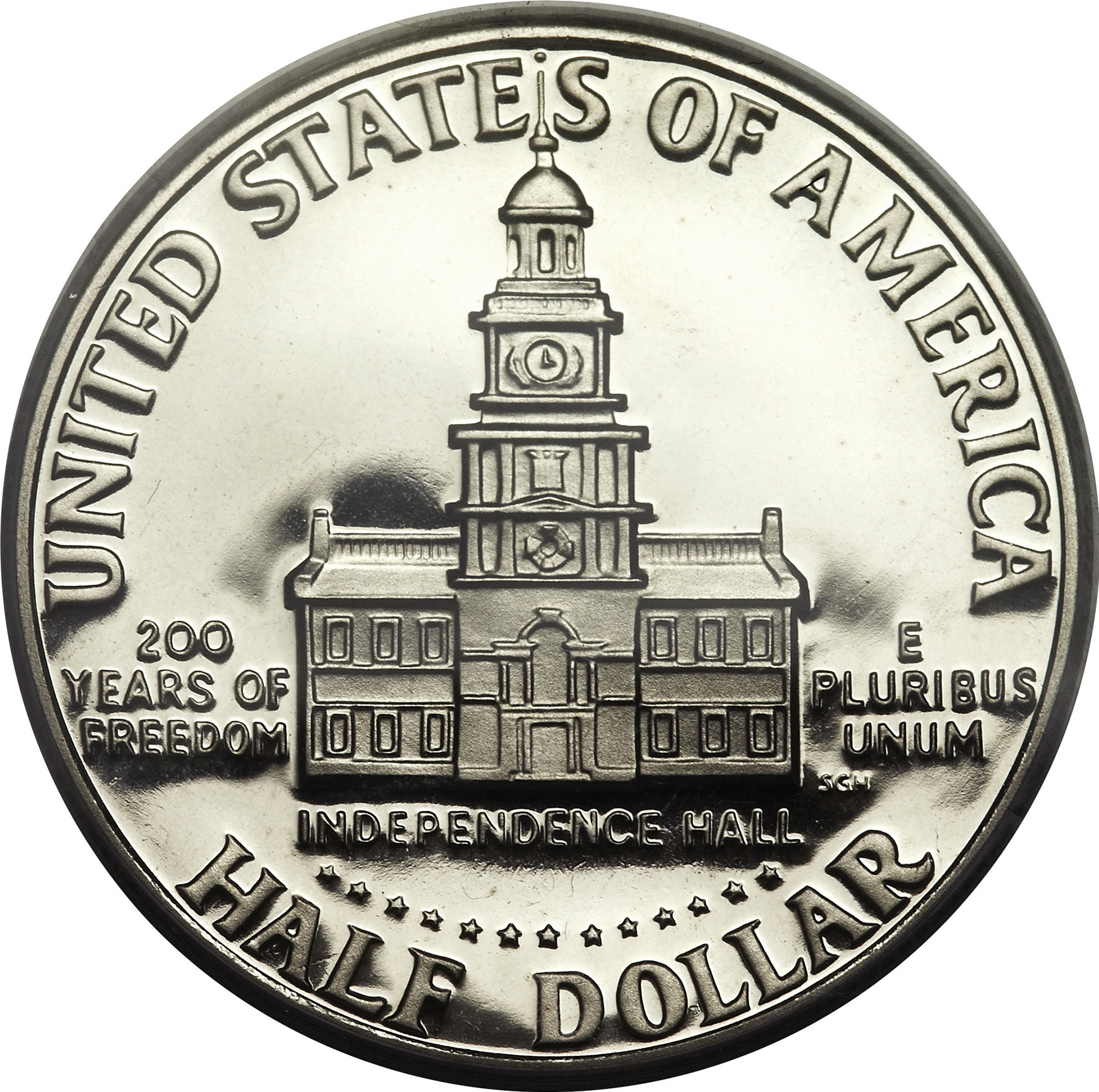
Half dollar Bicentennial reverse

On March 5, 1973, Brooks announced that the Mint would be soliciting new reverse designs for the half dollar and dollar to commemorate the 1976 United States Bicentennial. On October 18, President Nixon signed Public Law 93-127, which provided for new reverse designs for the quarter, half dollar, and dollar. The designs were to be emblematic of the Bicentennial era. The Mint announced a competition open to all American sculptors. Seth G. Huntington's design depicting Independence Hall was selected for the half dollar. All half dollars struck in 1975 and 1976 bore the double date 1776-1976 on the obverse and Huntington's design on the reverse. Over 521 million Bicentennial half dollars were struck for circulation at the Denver and Philadelphia mints.

Following the high mintage of the Bicentennial coins, the number of half dollars struck per year declined. However, in 1979, Mint Director Stella B. Hackel indicated that the Mint would continue to strike them. "We really don't think many half dollars are being used in commerce. They do go somewhere, though, so someone must want them." By then, more than 2.5 billion Kennedy half dollars had been struck since 1964, more than all previously struck US half dollars combined. The New York Times numismatic columnist Ed Reiter suggested that hoarding had continued even into the base-metal era, accounting for the shortage of halves in commerce. The silver boom of 1979–80 saw a large increase in the amount of sales and destruction of many hoarded 1964–1969 silver Kennedy half dollars. Record high silver prices caused extensive melting of silver coins, especially half dollars and silver dollars for their metal content.

=== Temporary halt in striking for circulation ===
Kennedy half dollars continued to be struck through the remainder of the twentieth century, and mintage numbers remained relatively steady in both the Philadelphia and Denver mints until 1987, a year in which no half dollars were struck for circulation; the Treasury had accumulated a two-year supply of the pieces, making further production unnecessary. Demand for half dollars dropped, and casinos (where they were commonly used) increasingly began producing fifty cent chips to use in place of the coins. With mintage numbers remaining low, beginning in 2002, the Kennedy half dollar ceased to be struck for general circulation. Rolls and bags of the current year's pieces could still be purchased from the Mint, at a premium above face value. Kennedy half dollars began to be produced for general circulation again in 2021.

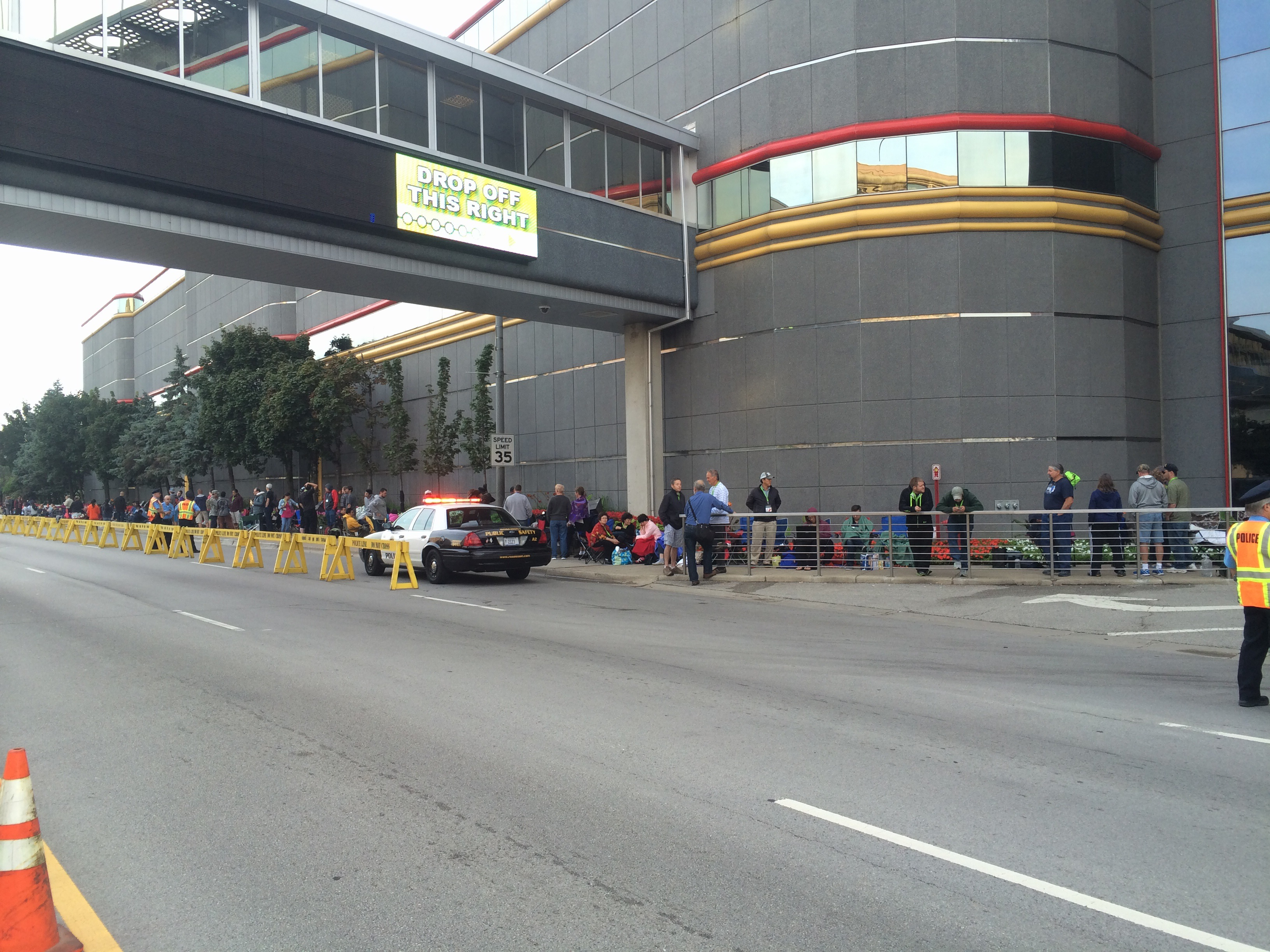
People line up to buy the new gold Kennedy half dollar, August 2014

=== 2014 50th Anniversary Issues ===
In January 2014, a private firm on behalf of the Mint, began surveying customers on possible options for a special issue in commemoration of the 50th anniversary of the Kennedy half dollar. In June, the Mint announced plans to issue seven special 2014 Kennedy halves in commemoration of the series' fiftieth anniversary: two in clad, from Philadelphia and Denver, four in silver from Philadelphia, Denver, San Francisco, and the West Point Mint, and one in .9999 gold, from West Point. The clad and silver versions bear the normal date; the gold coin has the double date 1964–2014. All have higher relief than the usual issues. The gold coins were released in conjunction with the American Numismatic Association convention in Rosemont, Illinois, on August 5, 2014.

=== 2020s redesign ===
The Circulating Collectible Coin Redesign Act of 2020 (Pub. L. 116–330 (text) (PDF)), signed by President Donald Trump, allows for a redesign in 2026, representing the United States Semiquincentennial, celebrating 250 years of the signing of the United States Declaration of Independence. From 2027 until 2030, there will be one reverse design each year depicting Paralympic sports. The obverse may be redesigned in 2027, and after 2030, starting from 2031, is still to bear Kennedy's visual image.

On December 11, 2025, the Mint announced that the 1776~2026 half dollar would have a theme of Enduring Liberty and depict the Statue of Liberty on the obverse. The reverse shows Liberty's torch being passed to a new generation.

== Collecting ==
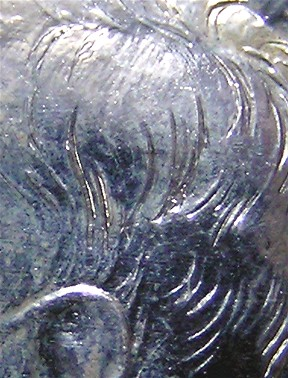
A close-up image detailing the heavily accented hairlines present on early Kennedy half dollar proof issues

With the exception of 1965 through 1967, proofs have been struck each year in the same metallic composition as regular issue pieces. The first Kennedy half dollar proofs were struck in early January 1964. Early strikes depicted Kennedy with heavily accented hair; an estimated 100,000 coins were struck with this feature. This was altered for the remainder of the mintage of nearly four million proof coins. Due to the coin shortage, the Treasury Department announced that no proof sets would be struck in 1965. Instead, Special Mint Sets would be struck to satisfy collector demand. Coins for these sets, minted at the San Francisco Assay Office, were struck with no mint marks early in 1966 with heavily polished dies dated 1965. Similar sets bearing the dates 1966 and 1967 were also struck. A few of the 1966 halves from the Special Mint Sets are known with Gasparro's initials "FG" missing from the reverse, apparently because of an overpolished die. The first year's production was sold in soft plastic packaging; the 1966 and 1967 issues were sonically sealed in hard plastic cases. In 1968, regular proof coinage was resumed, although production of proof coins was shifted to San Francisco, the "S" mintmark added and sets were encapsulated in hard plastic.

In 1973, Congress authorized silver-clad collector versions of the Bicentennial coins; in April 1975, the Mint began to strike them. The coins were issued in both proof and uncirculated quality. Copper-nickel clad Bicentennial coins were placed in both the 1975 and 1976 proof sets, while their silver clad counterparts were sold in three-coin sets. From 1992 to 2018, the Mint struck Kennedy half dollars in 90% silver for inclusion in special silver proof sets. In 1964 proofs were struck in Philadelphia, and since 1968, proof coins have been struck in San Francisco only. In 1998, some silver proof pieces were struck to a matte finish for inclusion in a set along with a Robert F. Kennedy commemorative silver dollar. From 2005–2010, uncirculated pieces included in mint sets received a matte finish, which differentiates them from the pieces sold in bags and rolls. Beginning in 2019, silver proof Kennedy half dollars were struck in 99.9% silver.

In addition to the Accented Hair variety, one variety of the Kennedy half which receives significant interest due to its rarity is the 1964 Special Mint Set ('SMS') half dollar; Approximately 'a dozen or so' examples have been located over the course of the 2000s to the present day, and feature a 'satin finish' with well-defined strikes and die polishing lines. It is the rarest non-error variety of the Kennedy half known to date. Examples of this variety typically sell for significant amounts of money; a 1964 Special Mint Set half dollar sold for $47,000 in 2016.

In 1998, a special "matte finish" Kennedy half dollar was issued as part of the two-coin "Kennedy Collectors Set", paired with a commemorative silver dollar honoring Robert F. Kennedy. Between 62,000 and 64,000 1998-S, matte finish coins were issued, making it the lowest mintage of the series.

Half dollars not intended for circulation, such as proof coins and those minted with dates 2002 through 2020 occasionally enter circulation; these issues are sometimes found through coin roll hunting by collectors, being referred to as NIFCs (from "Not Intended for Circulation").

In 2019, an Enhanced Reverse Proof Kennedy half dollar was included in a special set with an Apollo 11 50th anniversary half dollar. The special Kennedy half was limited to a maximum mintage of 100,000 coins and sold out.

== See also ==
- Kennedy half dollar mintage figures
- Cultural depictions of John F. Kennedy
- Coins of the United States dollar
- Big Nickel, a coin monument in Greater Sudbury, Ontario, Canada which was once paired with a similar large replica of the Kennedy half dollar

== Bibliography ==
- Lange, David W. (2006). History of the United States Mint and its Coinage. Atlanta: Whitman Publishing. ISBN 978-0-7948-1972-9.
- Gomez, Darryl A. (2015). Authoritative Numismatist Reference: Presidential Medal of Appreciation Award Medals 1958 - 1963. Charleston, SC: CreateSpace. ISBN 978-1511786744.
- Taxay, Don (1983) [1966]. The U.S. Mint and Coinage (reprint ed.). New York: Sanford J. Durst Numismatic Publications. ISBN 978-0-915262-68-7.
- Tomaska, Rick (2011). A Guide Book of Franklin & Kennedy Half Dollars. Atlanta: Whitman Publishing. ISBN 978-0-7948-3243-8.
- Yeoman, R.S. (2014). Bressett, Kenneth (ed.). A Guide Book of United States Coins 2015 (68th ed.). Atlanta, Georgia: Whitman Publishing. ISBN 978-079484215-4. OCLC 875521690. OL 28306197M.

Preceded by Franklin half dollar	Kennedy half dollar (1964–2025)	Succeeded by United States Semiquincentennial coinage
