= William Brett =

William Brett may refer to:

- William Brett, 1st Viscount Esher (1815–1899), British lawyer and politician
- William Henry Brett (missionary) (1818–1886), Anglican missionary to British Guiana
- William Howard Brett (1846–1918), American librarian
- William H. Brett (1893–1989), American civil servant
- William Henry Brett (British Columbia politician) (1895–1972), Canadian politician in British Columbia
- William Brett, Baron Brett (1942–2012), British politician
