= Mary Brooks =

American politician (1907–2002)

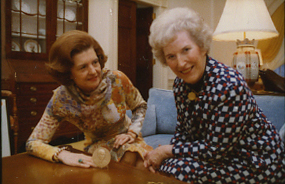
- Betty Ford (left) meeting with Mary Brooks, 1975

31st Director of the United States Mint
- In office September 1969 – February 1977
- President: Richard Nixon; Gerald Ford
- Preceded by: Eva Adams
- Succeeded by: Stella Hackel Sims

Member of the Idaho Senate
- In office 1963–1969
- Succeeded by: John Peavey

Personal details
- Born: Mary Elizabeth Thomas; November 1, 1907 Colby, Kansas, U.S.
- Died: February 11, 2002 (aged 94) Twin Falls, Idaho, U.S.
- Party: Republican
- Spouse(s): Arthur J. Peavey, Jr. (widowed 1941); Charles W. Brooks (widowed 1957)
- Children: John Peavey (1933-2024); Elizabeth Ann "Betty" Eccles (née Peavey) (1936–2004)
- Parent(s): John Thomas; Florence Johnson
- Education: University of Idaho, B.A. 1929; Mills College, A.A. 1927

Mary Elizabeth Thomas Peavey Brooks (November 1, 1907 – February 11, 2002) was an American politician. She directed the United States Mint from September 1969 to February 1977.

== Early life and education ==
Mary Elizabeth Thomas was born to John Thomas and Florence (Johnson) Thomas on November 1, 1907, in Colby, Kansas. Her parents moved to Gooding, Idaho, in early 1909 when she was 14 months of age. Her father was a rancher and banker; he was appointed a U.S. Senator from Idaho twice (following the deaths of Frank R. Gooding in 1928 and William Borah in 1940).

An only child, Thomas graduated from Gooding High School in 1925, and attended Mills College in Oakland, California, then a two-year women's school. She transferred to the University of Idaho in Moscow in 1927, where she was a member of the Kappa Kappa Gamma sorority, and received her bachelor's degree in economics in 1929.

== Marriages ==
She met her first husband, Arthur Jacob "Art" Peavey, Jr. of Twin Falls, while they were students at the University of Idaho. He was a member of Phi Delta Theta fraternity and also graduated in 1929. He drowned in a boating accident on the Snake River in 1941 and wasn't found for ten days, which left her a widow in her early thirties with two young children. A short time later her mother died, so she moved her family to Washington, D.C., where her father was serving in the U.S. Senate.

Her second husband, C. Wayland "Curly" Brooks, was a U.S. Senator from Illinois. They were married in May 1946 for eleven years, until his death from a massive heart attack in 1957. After he left the Senate in January 1949, they had lived in the Chicago area.

Brooks took over her father's Idaho sheep ranch after his death in 1945 and ran it until her son took it over in 1961.

== Idaho Senate ==
Brooks was elected to the Idaho State Senate in 1964, and served until 1969, when she was named to head the U.S. Mint by President Nixon in September. Her son, John Peavey, was appointed to her seat in the state senate and served for all but two of the next 25 years. (He lost the Republican primary in 1976, then won the seat back as a Democrat in 1978.) A failed attempt at lieutenant governor in 1994 marked the end of his political career.

== Director of the United States Mint ==
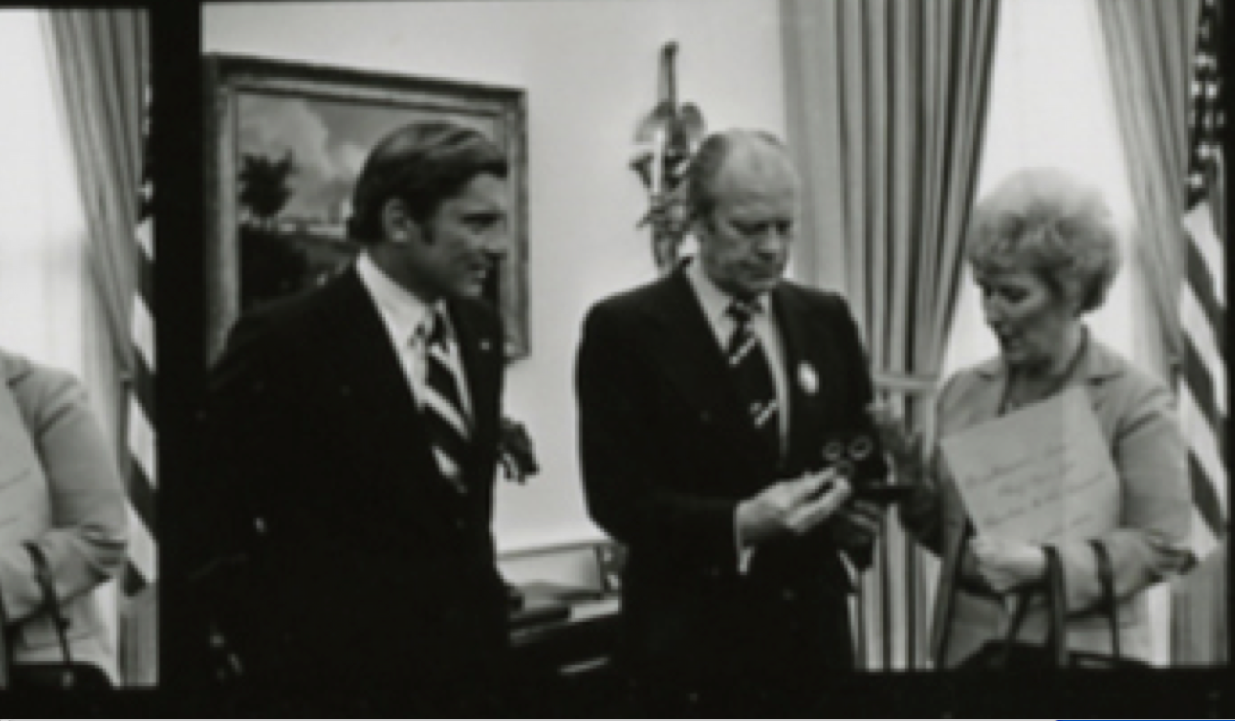
Mint Director Mary Brooks presents President Gerald Ford (center) with the first set of the Bicentennial coins, November 13, 1974 as American Revolutionary Bicentennial Administration Director John Warner looks on.

President Nixon appointed Brooks director of the U.S. Mint, the third woman named to the post. She oversaw the first production of the Eisenhower dollar coin, as well as the design of the Bicentennial quarter, half dollar, and dollar coins for the United States Bicentennial.

She is credited with saving the original San Francisco Mint building, known as the "Granite Lady," by transferring it to the Treasury Department. The building, one of the few to survive the Great Earthquake of 1906, had been vacant since 1937 and fallen into disrepair. It is now both a National Historic Landmark and a California Historical Landmark. Brooks received the "I Left My Heart In San Francisco" Award in 1974 from the San Francisco Convention and Visitors Bureau for her preservation efforts.

During Brooks' tenure as Director of the Mint, she famously led a tour of the U.S. Bullion Depository at Fort Knox, Kentucky for members of Congress and the news media on September 23, 1974. (Note: "One Rockefeller detractor, Peter Beter, even charged that the Fort Knox gold had been spirit'd away in the dead of night only to wind up in the European vaults of David Rockefeller. This charge was proved to be erroneous as Mary T. Brooks, director of the U.S. Mint, conducted a group of congressmen on a rare visit to the Kentucky vaults. Yes, the gold was there and intact.") As of 2012, this tour still is the only time that the inside of the USBD has been seen by members of the public.

In addition, Brooks was awarded the American Numismatic Association's Medal of Merit in 1988, and was the first woman to receive the United States Treasury Department's highest honor, the Alexander Hamilton Award. She was inducted into the University of Idaho Alumni Association's Hall of Fame in 1970. The university also conferred upon her an honorary doctorate in 1999.

== Death ==
Brooks died in 2002 at age 94 in Twin Falls. She was survived by a son, John Peavey (1933–2024), of Carey, and a daughter, Elizabeth Ann "Betty" Eccles (1936–2004), of McCall, and six grandchildren and eight great-grandchildren.

== Notes ==
Government offices
Preceded by Eva Adams	31st Director of the United States Mint; September 1969 – February 1977	Succeeded by Stella Hackel Sims
