= Eisenhower dollar =

United States dollar coin

- United States
- Value: 1 U.S. dollar
- Mass: Copper/nickel-clad: ~22.68 g (350 gr) Silver clad: ~24.624 g (380 gr)
- Diameter: 38.1 mm (1.5 in)
- Thickness: 2.58 mm (0.1 in)
- Edge: reeded
- Composition: Circulation strikes: outer layers of 75.0% copper 25.0% nickel clad with a core of 100% copper (in all 91.67% copper, 8.33% nickel). For silver clad: Outer layers of 80% silver with a center of 20.9% silver. Aggregate 60% copper, 40% silver
- Silver: None in circulation strikes. For silver-clad pieces 0.3162 troy oz
- Years of minting: 1971–1978. Coins struck in 1975 and 1976 bear double date "1776–1976"
- Mint marks: D, S. Located on the obverse beneath Eisenhower's bust. Mint mark omitted on Philadelphia Mint issues.

Obverse
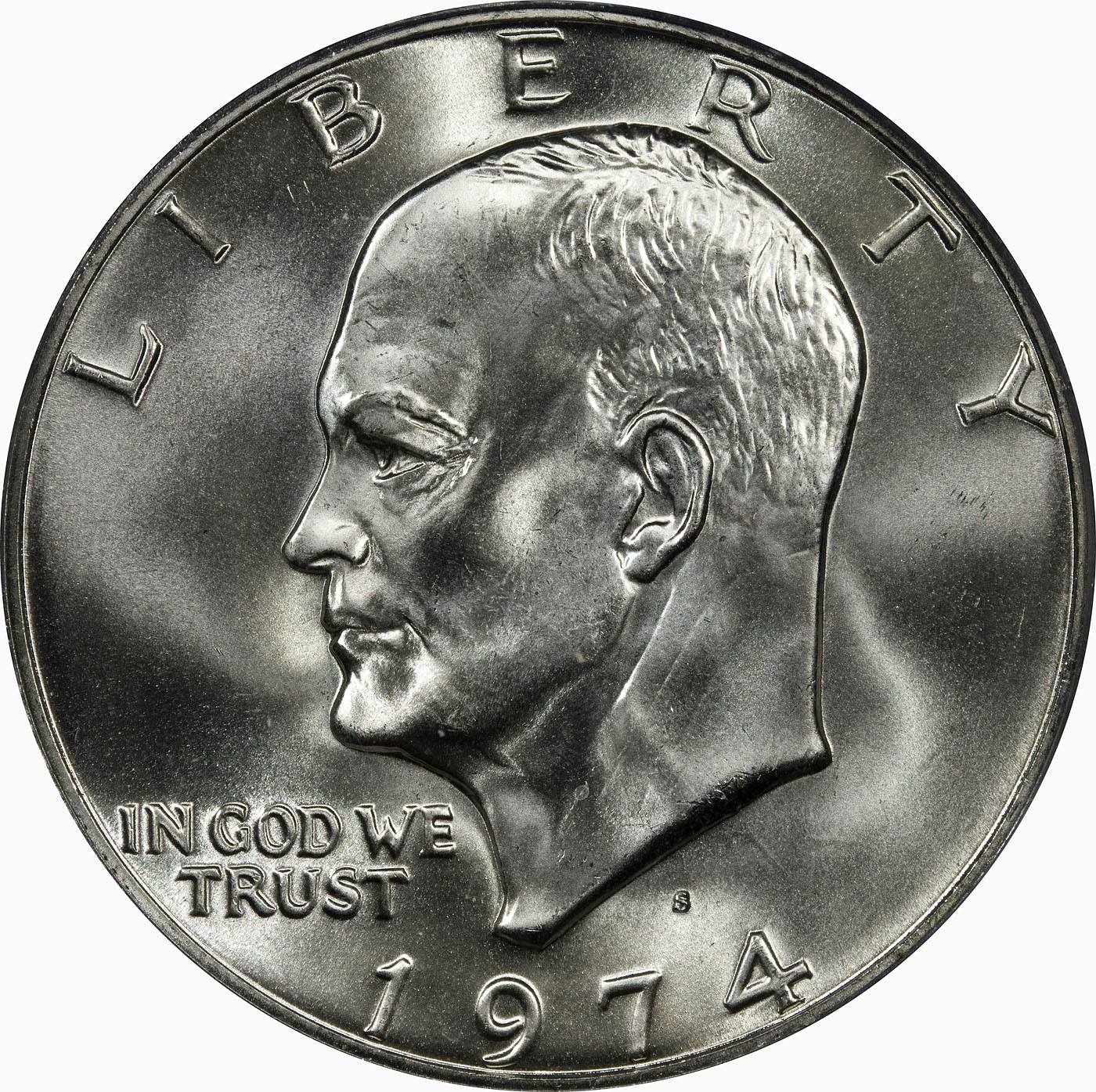
- Design: Dwight D. Eisenhower
- Designer: Frank Gasparro
- Design date: 1971

Reverse
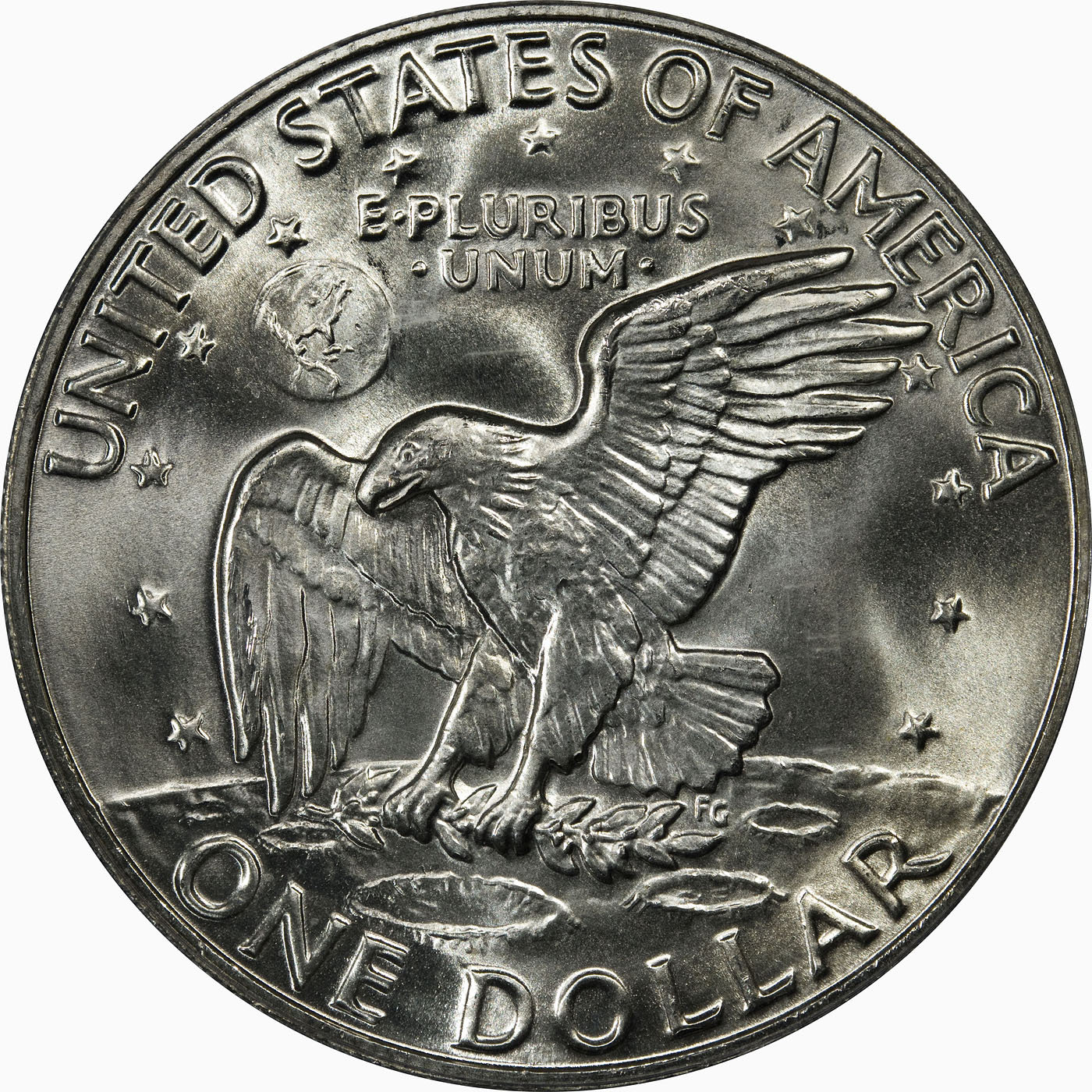
- Design: Eagle clutching olive branch landing on the Moon, based on the Apollo 11 mission insignia designed by astronaut Michael Collins
- Designer: Frank Gasparro
- Design date: 1971 (Not struck in 1975–76)

The Eisenhower dollar is a one-dollar coin issued by the United States Mint from 1971 to 1978; it was the first coin of that denomination issued by the Mint since the Peace dollar series ended in 1935. The coin depicts President Dwight D. Eisenhower on the obverse, and a stylized image honoring the 1969 Apollo 11 Moon mission on the reverse. Both sides were designed by Frank Gasparro, with the reverse based on the mission patch designed by astronaut Michael Collins. It is the only large-size U.S. dollar coin whose circulation strikes contained no silver.

In 1965, because of rises in bullion prices, the Mint began to strike copper-nickel clad coins instead of silver. No dollar coins had been issued for thirty years, but, beginning in 1969, legislators sought to reintroduce a dollar coin into commerce. After Eisenhower died that March, there were a number of proposals to honor him with the new coin. While these bills generally commanded wide support, enactment was delayed by a dispute over whether the new dollar coin should be in base metal or 40% silver. In 1970, a compromise was reached to strike the Eisenhower dollar in base metal for circulation, and in 40% silver as a collectible. On December 31, 1970, President Richard Nixon, who had served as vice president under Eisenhower, signed legislation authorizing mintage of the new coin.

Although the 40% silver collector's pieces sold well, the new base-metal dollars failed to circulate to any significant degree, except in and around Nevada casinos, where they were preferred over privately issued tokens. There are no dollar coins dated 1975; coins struck that year and from 1976 bear the double date 1776–1976, and a special reverse by Dennis R. Williams in honor of the bicentennial of American independence. Beginning in 1977, the Mint sought to replace the cumbersome Eisenhower dollar with a smaller-sized coin. Congress authorized the Susan B. Anthony dollar, struck beginning in 1979, but that coin also failed to circulate. Given their modest cost and the short length of the series, complete sets of Eisenhower dollars are inexpensive to assemble and are gaining popularity with coin collectors.

== Background ==
The silver dollar had never been a popular coin, circulating little except in the West; it served as a means of monetizing metal and generally sat in bank vaults once struck. The Peace dollar, the last circulating dollar made of silver, was not struck after 1935, and in most years in the quarter century after that, the bullion value of a silver dollar did not exceed 70 cents. In the early 1960s, though, silver prices rose, and the huge stocks of silver dollars in the hands of banks and the government were obtained by the public through the redemption of silver certificates. This caused shortages of silver dollars in the western states where the pieces circulated, and interests there sought the issuance of more dollars.

On August 3, 1964, Congress passed legislation providing for the striking of 45 million silver dollars. This legislation was enacted when coins vanished from circulation (under Gresham's law) as the price of silver rose past $1.29 per ounce, making silver dollars worth more as bullion than as currency. The new pieces were intended to be used at Nevada casinos and elsewhere in the West where "hard money" was popular. Numismatic periodicals complained that striking the dollars was a waste of resources. The law had been passed at the urging of the Senate Majority Leader, Mike Mansfield (Democrat–Montana), who represented a state that heavily used silver dollars. Despite the efforts of Mint Director Eva Adams and her staff to persuade him, Senator Mansfield refused to consider any cancellation or delay, and on May 12, 1965, the Denver Mint began striking 1964-D Peace dollars—the Mint had obtained congressional authorization to continue striking 1964-dated coins into 1965.

A public announcement of the new pieces was made on May 15, 1965, only to be met with a storm of objections. Both the public and many congressmen saw the issue as a poor use of Mint resources at a time of severe coin shortages, which would only benefit coin dealers. On May 24, one day before a hastily called congressional hearing, Adams announced that the pieces were deemed trial strikes, never intended for circulation. The Mint later stated that 316,076 pieces had been struck; all were reported melted amid heavy security. To ensure that there would be no repetition, Congress inserted a provision in the Coinage Act of 1965 forbidding the coinage of silver dollars for five years. That act also removed silver from the dime and quarter, and reduced the silver content of the half dollar to 40%.

== Inception ==
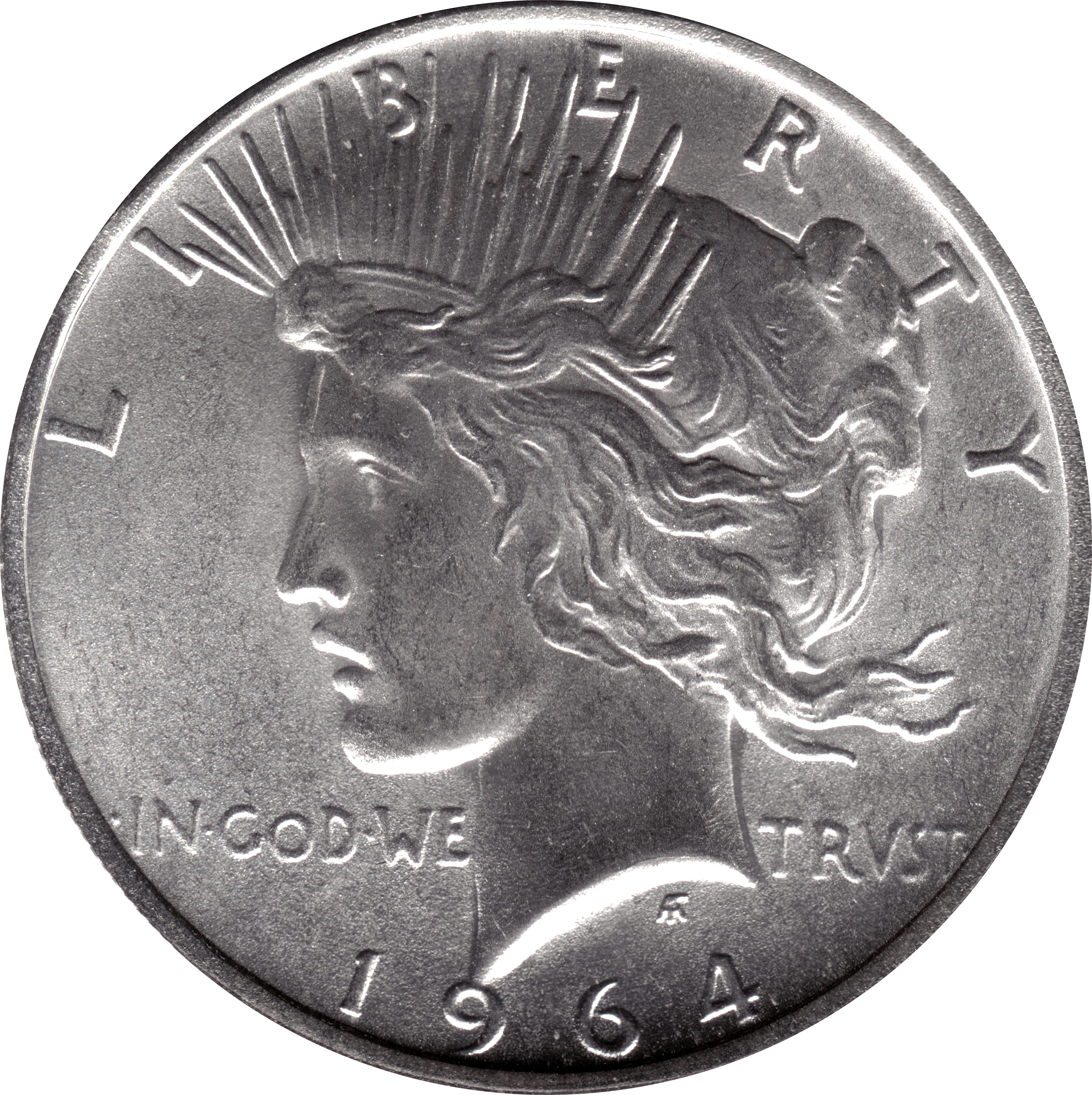
An unofficially produced 1964-D Peace dollar, struck over a genuine silver dollar by a private mint

In 1969, Nixon administration Mint Director Mary Brooks sought the reissuance of the dollar coin. By this time, rising bullion prices threatened the continued use of silver in the Kennedy half dollar, but Brooks hoped to maintain the dollar as a silver coin. Brooks's proposal for a new silver dollar was opposed by the chairman of the House Banking Committee, Wright Patman, who had been persuaded, against his better judgment, by Nixon's predecessor, Lyndon Johnson, to support the continued use of silver in the half dollar.

On March 28, 1969, former president and World War II general Dwight D. Eisenhower died. Soon after, New Jersey Representative Florence Dwyer, like Eisenhower, a Republican, suggested that the proposed dollar coin bear his likeness. She spoke to Democratic Missouri Representative Leonor Sullivan, who agreed that the dollar should bear a portrait of Eisenhower as "equal time" to the half dollar, which bore the likeness of Democratic president John F. Kennedy. A bill was filed by Connecticut Congressman Robert N. Giaimo to authorize an Eisenhower dollar, to be struck without silver content. The Joint Commission on the Coinage, drawing members from the administration and from Congress, including Giaimo, recommended the dollar in spring 1969. It also called for the elimination of silver from the half dollar, and for the transfer from the Treasury to the General Services Administration (GSA) of quantities of rare silver dollars, so they could be sold. Giaimo noted that the coin would be useful in casinos, which were striking their own tokens in the absence of circulating dollar coins, and in the vending industry, which was starting to sell higher-priced items.

On October 3, 1969, the House Banking Committee passed legislation for a base-metal Eisenhower dollar, with Patman stating that he hoped to have it approved by the full House in time for the late president's birthday on October 14. On October 6, the bill's sponsors lost a procedural vote which would have allowed for no amendments. While some representatives spoke against the manner in which the legislation was to be considered, Iowa Congressman H. R. Gross objected to the base-metal composition of the proposed coin: "You would be doing the memory of President Eisenhower no favor to mint a dollar made perhaps of scrap metal." Both houses voted on October 14, Eisenhower's birthday. Although the House passed the administration-backed bill for a base metal dollar, the Senate passed the bill as amended by Colorado Senator Peter Dominick, calling for the piece to be minted in 40% silver. Instrumental in the passage of the Senate amendment was a letter from Mamie Eisenhower, recalling that her husband had liked to give silver dollars as mementoes, and had gone to some effort to obtain coins struck in the year of his birth, 1890. Idaho Senator James McClure stated, "It is somehow beneath the dignity of a great president like General Eisenhower to withhold silver from the coin." On October 29, 1969, Texas Representative Robert R. Casey introduced legislation to honor both Eisenhower and the recent Apollo 11 Moon landing. These provisions would become part of the enacted bill authorizing the Eisenhower dollar. Casey originally wanted the mission theme of Apollo 11, "We came in peace for all mankind," to appear on the coin; when the Mint informed him that there was not room for that inscription, he settled for requiring that the reverse design be emblematic of that theme.

In March 1970, the two houses reached a compromise whereby 150 million dollars would be struck in the 40% silver alloy for collectors and others. The circulating dollar, though, would have no silver and would be struck in larger quantities. The 47.4 million troy ounces (1,470 tonnes) of silver needed to strike the collectors' pieces would come from bullion already held by the government. The compromise was worked out by McClure and other congressional Republicans, with the aid of Brooks, an Idahoan. McClure described the deal as "a lot less than the country deserves, but a lot more than it appeared we would get". The reason for having a collector's edition with silver was to avoid the hoarding which had driven the Kennedy half dollar from circulation.

Although the compromise passed the Senate in March 1970, it was blocked in the House by Representative Patman, who was determined to end silver in the coinage. The Senate passed the bill again in September, this time attaching it as a rider to a bank holding company bill sought by Patman. The bill, which also included provisions to eliminate silver from the half dollar and to transfer the rare silver dollars to the GSA, was approved by a conference committee and passed both houses. Nixon had intended to let the bill pass into law without his signature. When aides realized that as Congress had adjourned, not signing the bill would pocket veto it, on December 31, 1970, Nixon hastily signed it only minutes before the midnight deadline.

== Design ==
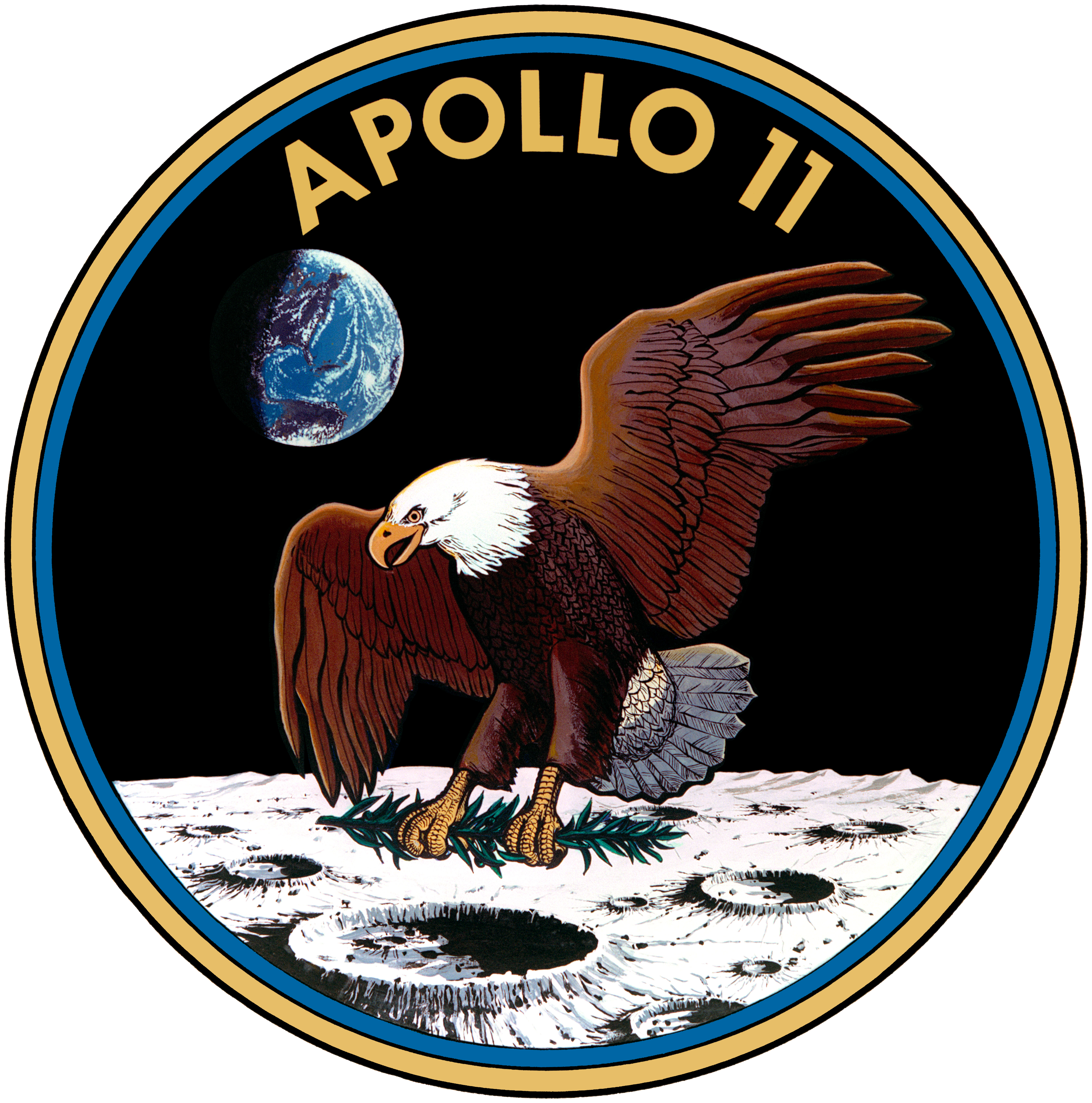
The Apollo 11 mission insignia, designed by astronaut Michael Collins, served as the basis of the Eisenhower dollar's reverse.

For Mint Chief Engraver Frank Gasparro, the opportunity to put Eisenhower on a coin was the fulfillment of a longtime dream. On June 19, 1945, Gasparro had been one of more than 4 million people who gathered in New York to watch a parade celebrating the Allied victory in Europe. Although Gasparro, then an assistant engraver at the Mint, only saw a glimpse of General Eisenhower, he stepped back from the crowd and drew the general's features. That sketch served as the basis of his design for the obverse. Gasparro consulted with the late president's widow, Mamie Eisenhower, as to the designs of both sides of the coin; the former First Lady was presented with a galvano (a metallic model used in the coin design process) by Brooks and Gasparro on January 1, 1971. Gasparro wrote in 1991 that he had six weeks to complete the work beginning in mid-November 1970, that his extensive research into eagles over the years was a great help in creating the reverse, and that his sketches were adopted without change. The chief engraver was not given full freedom of design; he was instructed to have the basic layout of the obverse resemble that of the Washington quarter.

Before the legislation passed, Gasparro had prepared two reverses, the one actually used, and a reverse with a more formal heraldic eagle, which numismatic historian and coin dealer Q. David Bowers finds reminiscent of pattern coins prepared in the 1870s. At Congress's insistence, the chief engraver created a design in commemoration of the Apollo 11 lunar landing, based on the mission patch conceived by astronaut Michael Collins and others. Bowers deems the choice of the lunar landing "a stroke of genius," allowing the dollar, which would be little-used in commerce, to be a commemorative both of Eisenhower and of the Moon mission. The reverse depicts an eagle (representing the Lunar Module Eagle) swooping low over the Moon's surface, holding an olive branch, token of peace, in its claws.

The use of Collins's mission patch design had initially been opposed by some government officials because of the fierce expression of the eagle; Gasparro's initial concept met similar objections. The Mint Director recalled that Gasparro had gone to the Philadelphia Zoo to look at eagles, and on his return had prepared a design which she felt emphasized the eagle's predatory nature. Brooks informed Gasparro that the eagle was "too fierce, too warlike, a little too aggressive" and asked that the expression be made friendlier. Gasparro, who reportedly was unhappy at having to change the eagle, described the final version as "pleasant looking". The State Department also feared that the eagle's expression might offend, and sought a neutral visage. The distant Earth may be seen above the bird, and there are 13 stars in honor of the original states.

Bowers deems the bust of Eisenhower "well modeled" by Gasparro, and notes that the fact that the eagle on the reverse holds only an olive branch, rather than arrows as well (token of war), "meant that the public would like the design". Nevertheless, he notes that Eisenhower's stern expression was widely criticized as not typical of a man noted for geniality. Numismatic author David Lange opines that "the Eisenhower dollar is one of the poorest products to emanate from the U.S. Mint." Lange writes that, although Gasparro had designed only one side of the coin for the Kennedy half dollar and Lincoln Memorial reverse for the cent, "the Eisenhower dollar was his design alone and should have served as a showcase for his talent. Sadly, it is a mediocre design that reveals his typically unnatural treatment of Ike's hair and the eagle's feathers." Some collectors complained after the release that the Earth was not fully shown, not realizing that Gasparro had carefully followed the mission badge. The chief engraver responded by clarifying the design.

== Release ==
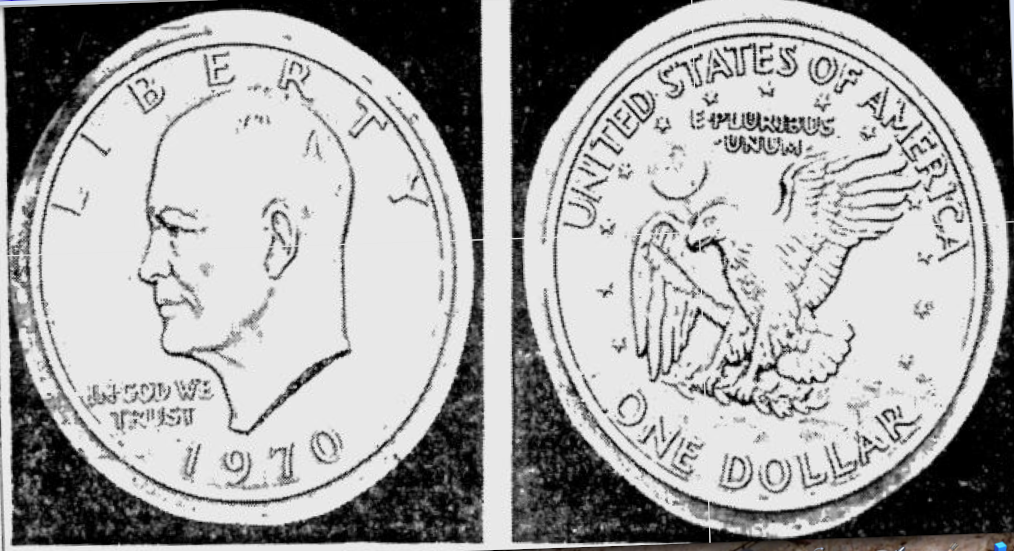
The Eisenhower dollar's design as released by the Treasury in January 1971 (probably from photographs of the galvano)

Two prototype dollars were struck at the Philadelphia Mint on January 25, 1971; they were subsequently destroyed. However, collectors have found at least two 1971-S coins that have been certified as prototypes. Striking such large pieces of tough copper-nickel proved destructive to the Mint's dies, and Gasparro repeatedly used the Janvier reducing lathe to lower the relief to be used on the circulation strikes and the uncirculated silver clad coins. The chief engraver altered the resulting master die directly to restore at least some of the detail which was lost as the relief was lowered. The proof coins struck at San Francisco, nevertheless, remained in high relief. This meant that in 1971 and for much of 1972 (until better-quality steel was used in the dies), the uncirculated strikes had a lower relief, less detailed surface, compared with the proof coins. Proof coins are struck slowly, and generally multiple times, to bring out the full detail. Striking of Eisenhower dollars for circulation began at Denver on February 3, apparently without any ceremony; minting at Philadelphia also began early in the year, although Bowers, in his comprehensive encyclopedia of silver and clad dollar coins, does not record a specific date. The first Eisenhower dollars in 40% silver, with an uncirculated finish, were struck at the San Francisco Assay Office (today the San Francisco Mint) on March 31, 1971; Brooks ceremoniously operated the presses. The first coin struck was for presentation to Mamie Eisenhower; the second to David Eisenhower (grandson of Dwight and Mamie Eisenhower) and the third to David Eisenhower's father-in-law, President Nixon.

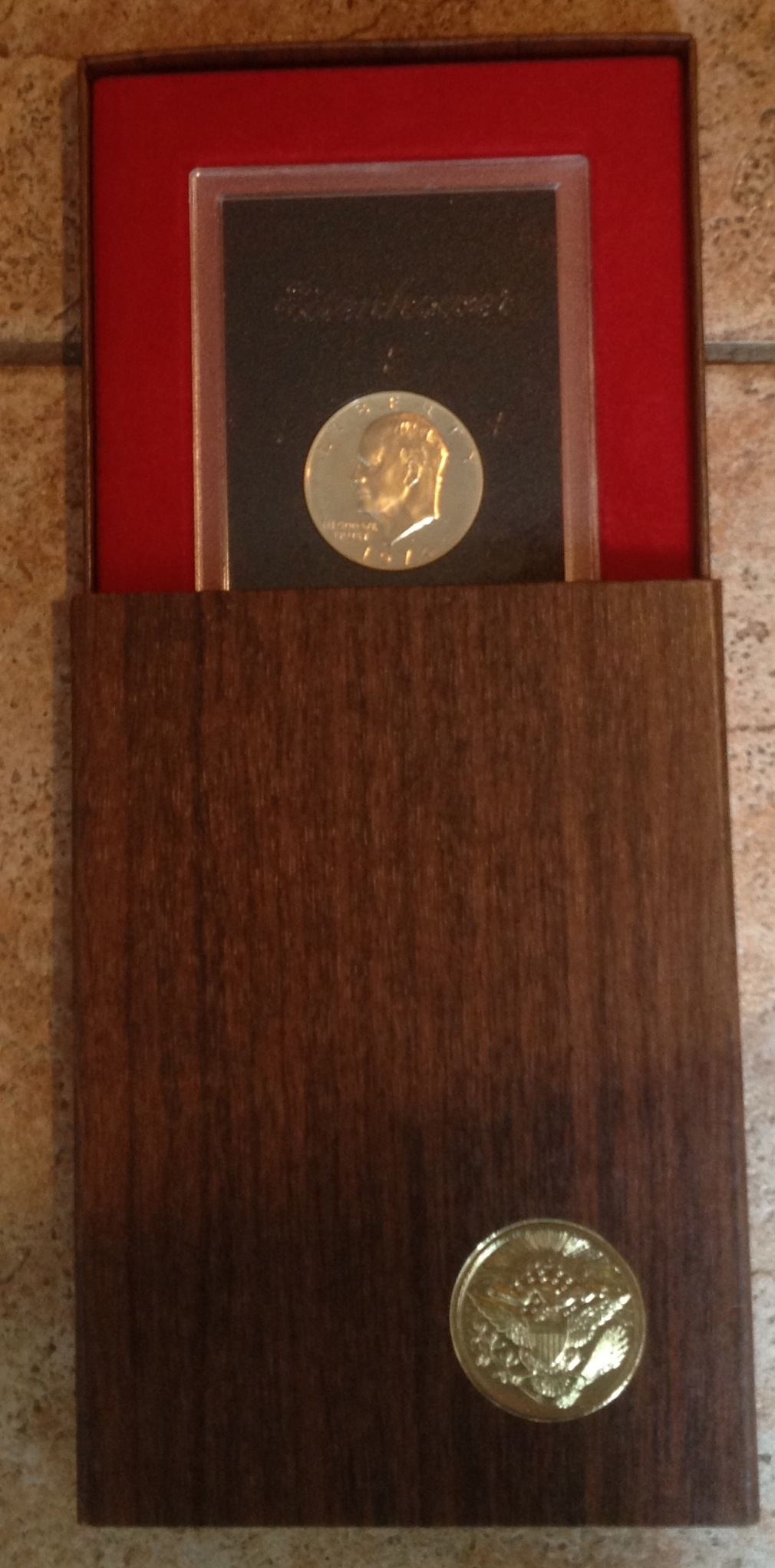
1974-S "brown Ike", partially open to show the coin and holder

On January 29, 1971, the Mint announced the prices for the 40% silver pieces which would be struck at San Francisco: $3 for uncirculated specimens and $10 for mirror-surfaced proof pieces, with orders to be taken by mail beginning on July 1, with a limit of five of each per customer. Order forms for the public were shipped to 44,000 post offices and 33,000 banks, with instructions not to hand them out until June 18. The Mint returned some orders for being sent in too early. Mint sets of the circulating coinage for 1971 did not include the Eisenhower dollar.

The first proof strikes, at San Francisco, took place in July. The proof pieces were sold in a plastic holder inside a brown box with a gold eagle seal; the uncirculated silver pieces were encased in pliofilm inside a blue envelope. These were dubbed "brown Ikes" and "blue Ikes" and are still known by those terms. On July 27, 1971, President Nixon presented the first piece to be struck to Mamie Eisenhower at a White House ceremony. Sales of the 40% silver pieces were ended on October 8; the first proof coins were mailed to collectors on October 14, President Eisenhower's birthday.

The clad circulation strikes of the Eisenhower dollar, the largest clad coin ever issued by the US Mint, were available to the general public through banks beginning on November 1, 1971. Many were hoarded by collectors; there was initially sufficient demand for the coins that many banks imposed a limit of one coin per customer. The clad pieces were struck from coinage strip purchased by the Mint from contractors. Many were not well-struck, causing collectors to purchase rolls in search of better specimens. An oily film was found on a large number of the coins; these coins were cleaned by collectors.

Though there was initially strong public interest in the new dollar, from the very start the coin still failed to circulate. In 1976, a Treasury study done in conjunction with a private-sector firm found that the Eisenhower dollar had a near-100 percent attrition rate, that is, almost always, a coin was used in only one transaction, and then stopped circulating (by comparison, the attrition rate of the quarter was close to zero). This was because of the coin's bulky size and weight, and the lack of potential uses for it. Even so, it was successful in quickly replacing private-issue tokens in Nevada casinos. According to numismatist Randy Camper, over 70% of "circulating" Eisenhower dollars were used in casinos. Although the vending machine industry lobbied for the Eisenhower dollar, few machines were modified to accept the coins. Lange recalled, "The fact is that these coins never circulated outside of casinos and nearby areas, and I don't recall ever seeing a vending machine that accepted them."

== Production ==
=== Early years (1971–1974) ===
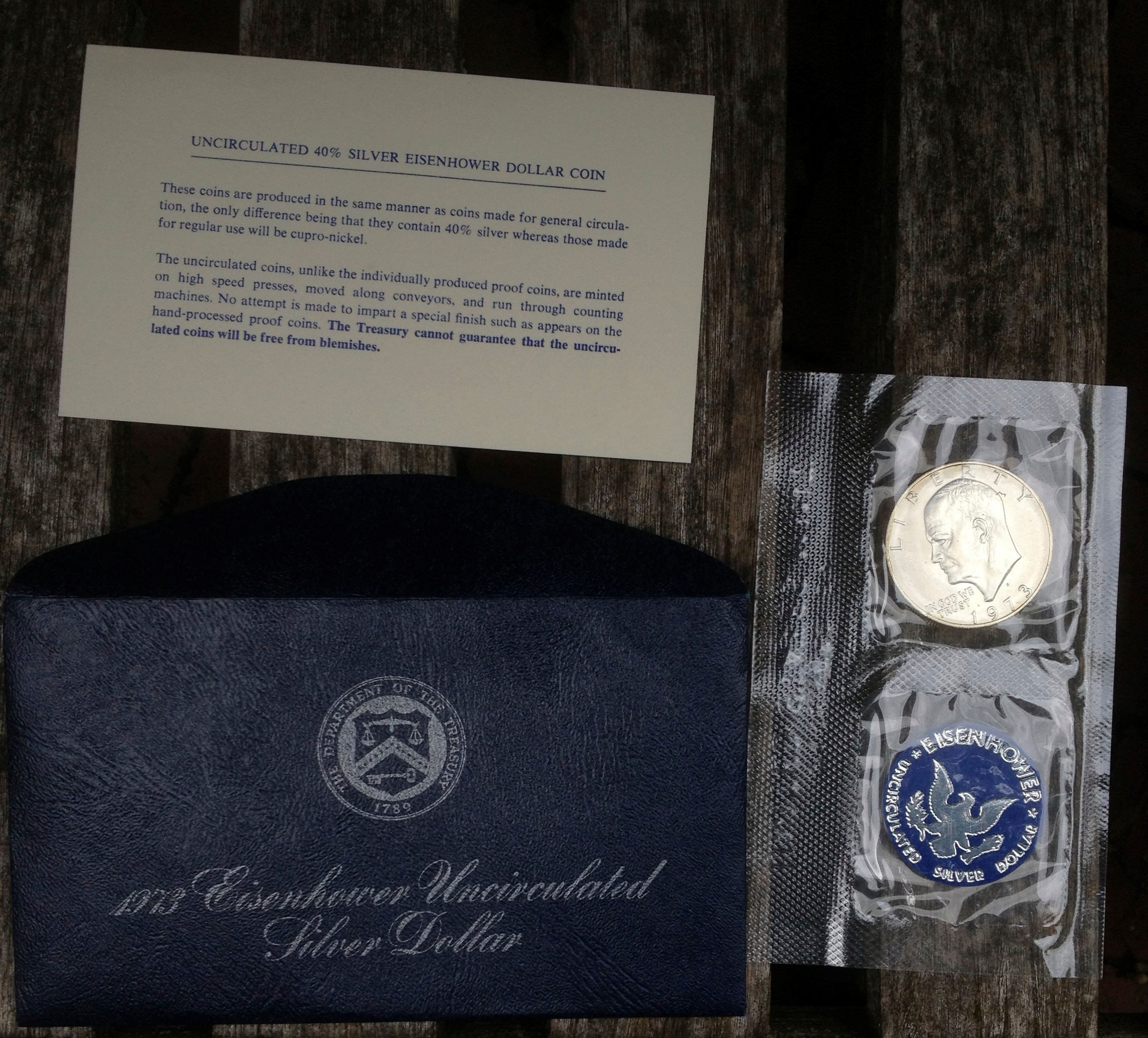
1973-S "blue Ike": envelope, pliofilm coin holder, and printed insert

The Mint struck over 125 million of the Eisenhower dollars in 1971, more than doubling its largest annual production for a dollar coin. Despite an increased mintage in 1972 to over 170 million, and despite what COINage magazine termed "near-heroic measures on the part of the Mint", the piece did not circulate. In a 1974 article for COINage, numismatist Clement F. Bailey noted, "the circulation value of the coin has been nil". Many Eisenhower dollars were put aside as souvenirs by non-collectors. Nevertheless, the silver coins sold so well that in October 1971, Mint Director Brooks warned that orders for 1971-S proof dollars would not all be filled until well into 1972. She ascribed the delay to the large public demand and to production difficulties which she indicated had been corrected. More than 11 million of the 1971-S silver pieces were sold, in proof and uncirculated, with over 4 million in proof. In May 1972, Treasury Secretary John Connally, testifying before a Senate committee, described the profits the Mint had made on the silver version of the Eisenhower dollar as "just unconscionable", with the average profit on a silver coin at $3.89, and expected to increase as production became more efficient. Mint officials felt that reducing the price would anger those who had already purchased the pieces.

The 1972 silver pieces were again struck at San Francisco. Sales dropped considerably, to just under 2.2 million specimens in uncirculated and 1.8 million in proof. The part-silver 1972-S Eisenhower dollars were available for sale by mail order, with the ordering period from May 1 to July 15 for the proof coins and August 1 to October 16 for the uncirculated version.

With ample supplies of Eisenhower dollars, the Federal Reserve had no need to order any in 1973, and none were struck for circulation. The 1973 and 1973-D were the first Eisenhower dollars struck for inclusion in mint sets, and were, in theory, only available that way. Over the years, many 1973 and 1973-D dollar coins have been found in circulation, leading to speculation that the 230,798 pieces which were reported melted, after the Mint failed to sell as many mint sets as anticipated, were released into circulation. John Wexler, Bill Crawford, and Kevin Flynn, in their volume on Eisenhower dollars, deny this, citing a 1974 letter from Assistant Director of the Mint for Public Services Roy C. Cahoon, which stated that all 1973 Eisenhower dollars from unsold mint sets were melted. The 1973-S was struck for inclusion in base-metal proof sets, as well as for the regular "blue Ikes" and "brown Ikes". Sales of the part-silver pieces dipped to a total of just under 2.9 million. The coin was struck again for circulation in 1974, was included in mint sets and proof sets, and was available in proof and uncirculated silver clad from San Francisco. Congress ordered that some of the money from the sale of 1974-S silver pieces be used to support Eisenhower College in Seneca Falls, New York. Coin collectors felt that this set a bad precedent, but about $9 million was paid to the college between 1974 and 1978; yet, despite the infusion of money, the college closed its doors in 1982.

=== Bicentennial issue (1975–1976) ===
Bicentennial Reverses
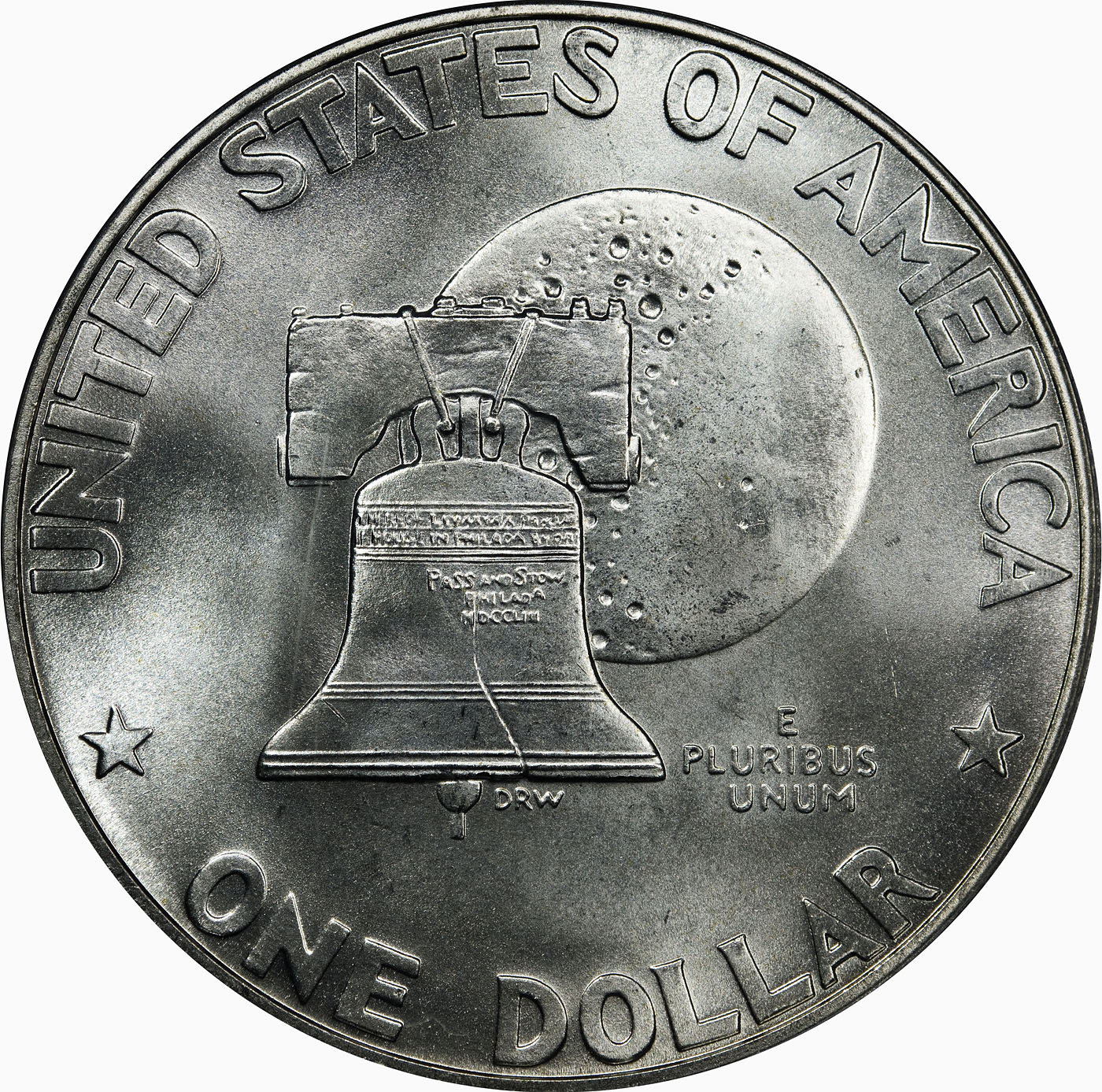
Type I Bicentennial, struck in 1975

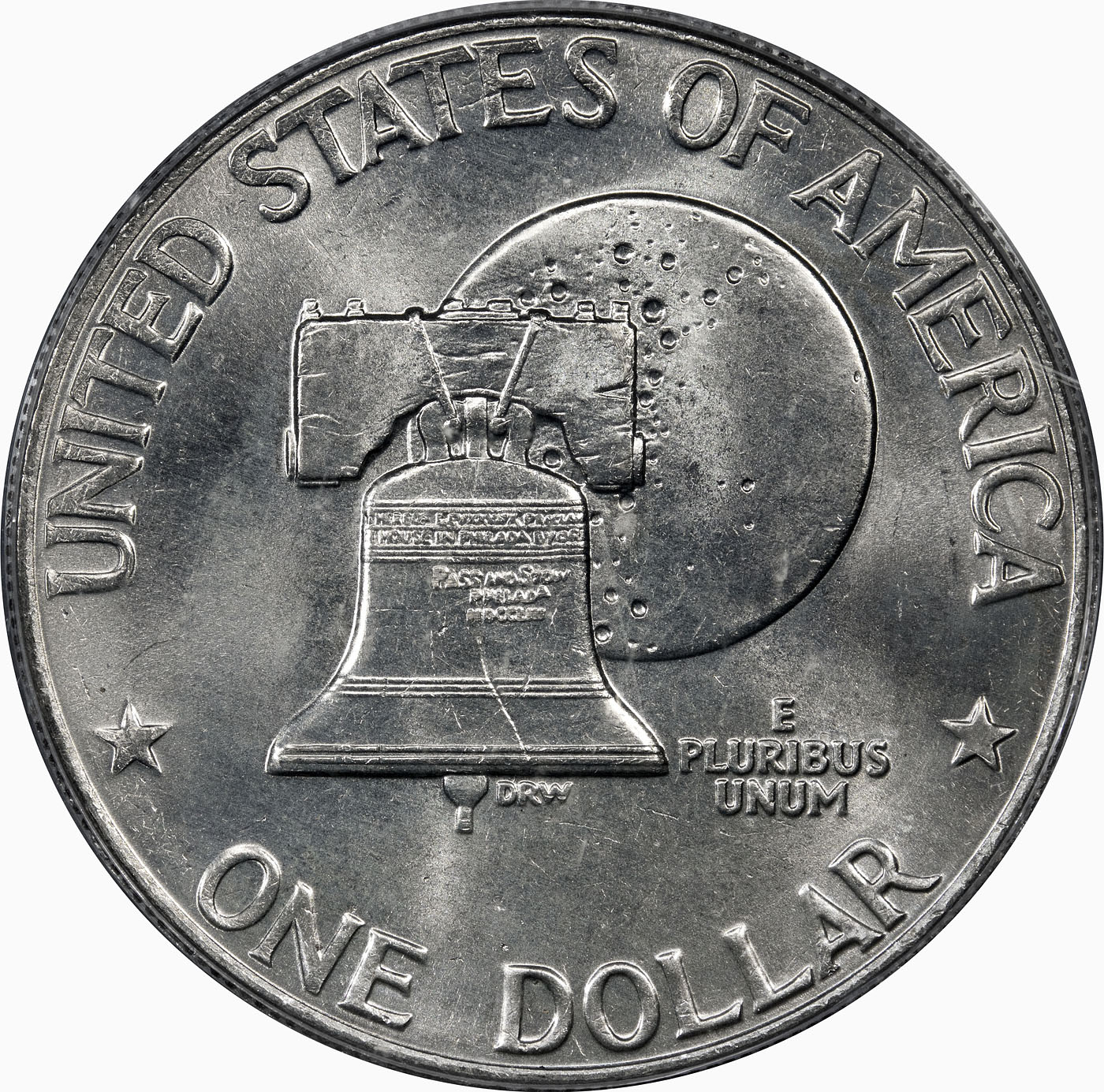
Type II Bicentennial, struck 1975–76

The United States had issued commemorative coins between 1892 and 1954, as a means for fundraising for organizations deemed worthy of federal support. A sponsoring organization would be designated in the authorizing legislation, and was permitted to buy up the issue at face value, selling it to the public at a premium, and pocketing the difference. Various problems with the issues, including mishandling of distributions and complaints that public coins should not be used for private profit, resulted in firm Treasury Department opposition to such issues, and none were struck after 1954.

The American Revolutionary Bicentennial Commission (ARBC) was established by Congress in 1966 as an oversight body for the 1976 two-hundredth anniversary of American independence (the "Bicentennial"). In 1970, its coins and medals advisory committee recommended the issuance of a special half dollar, and subsequently the committee sought the temporary redesign of circulating American coins. Brooks and the Mint initially opposed legislation to effect these proposals, but eventually Brooks supported legislation to redesign the reverses of the quarter, half dollar and dollar coins, and to issue special collector's sets in silver clad. Legislation to authorize this was signed by President Nixon on October 18, 1973. By the terms of this legislation, coins of these denomination minted for delivery after July 4, 1975, and before December 31, 1976, would bear special reverses, and also be dated 1776–1976. A total of 15 million sets (45 million) coins in all would be struck in silver clad for sale to the public at a premium.

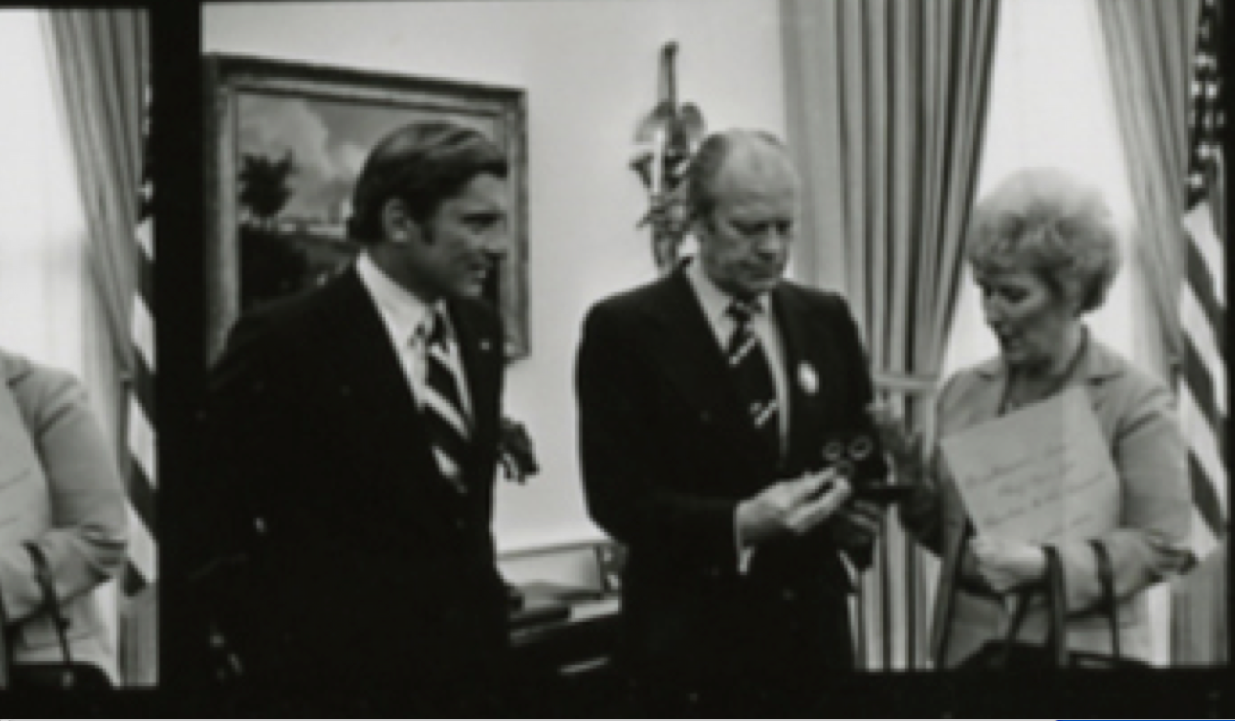
Mint Director Mary Brooks presents President Gerald Ford (center) with the first set of the Bicentennial coins, November 13, 1974, as American Revolutionary Bicentennial Administration Director John Warner looks on.

Type II Eisenhower dollar (1976)
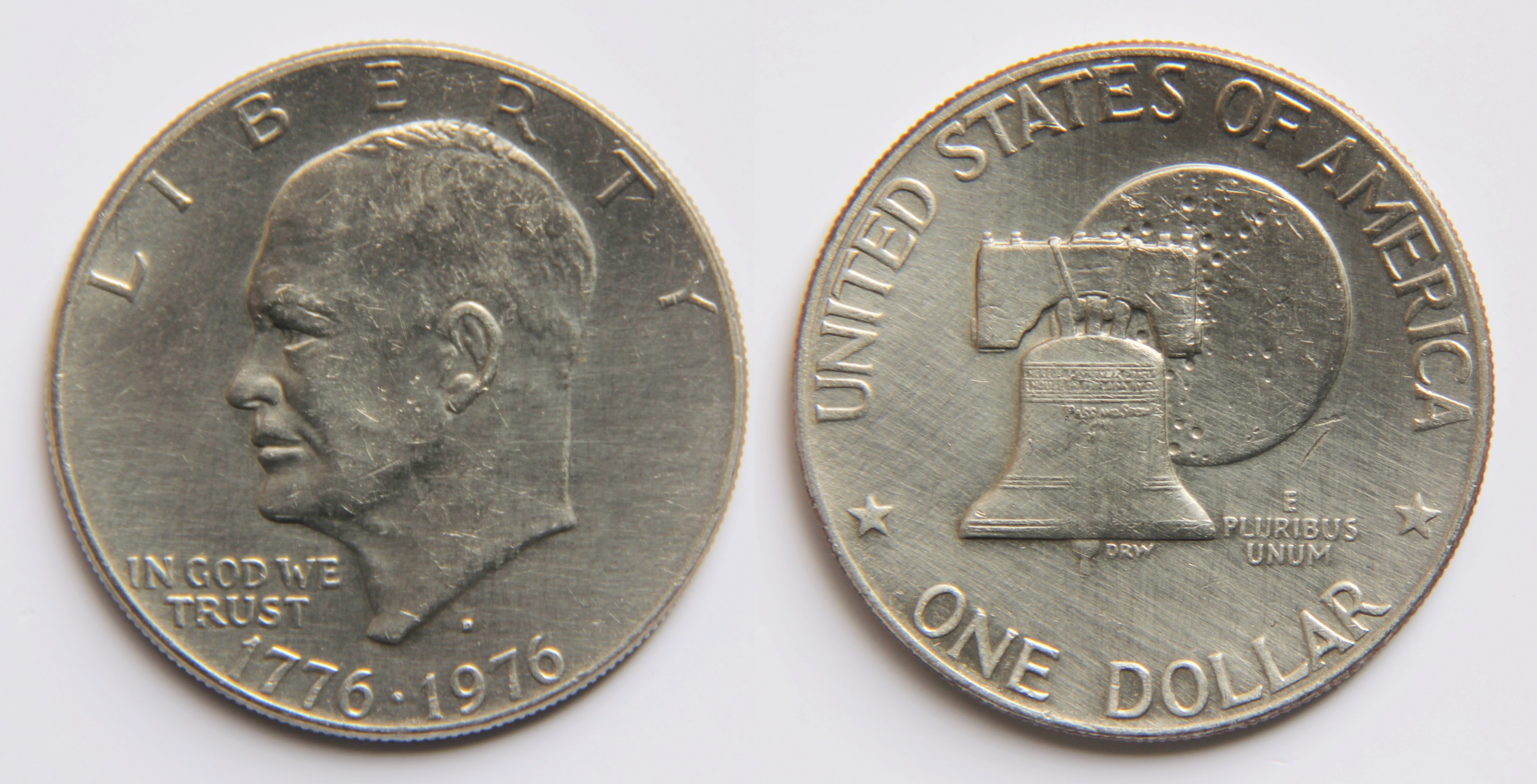
First side of the image: Obverse: Eisenhower portrait, US national motto, Liberty on top, US Independence year (1776) and year of minting (1976)
Second side of the image: Reverse: Liberty Bell in front of Moon, country name, face value and E pluribus unum (Out of many, one)
Coin made of silver

The reverse designs for the three Bicentennial coins were determined by a design competition open to the public. This competition closed in January 1974, and in March, a design submitted by 22-year-old art student Dennis R. Williams was selected for the dollar. Williams, the youngest person to that point to design a U.S. coin, had submitted a design depicting the Liberty Bell superimposed against the Moon. Gasparro slightly modified the design, simplifying the features visible on the lunar surface, and altering the lettering and the bell. Williams and the designers of the other denominations operated the presses to strike the first coins on August 12, 1974; a set of these prototypes was later given to the new president, Gerald Ford. Williams's design was liked by the public but attracted criticism from some numismatists as the Liberty Bell had been previously used on coinage (for example, on the Franklin half dollar). Fearing that a low-mintage 1975 piece would be hoarded, the Mint obtained legislation in December 1974 allowing it to continue coining 1974-dated pieces until it began coinage of Bicentennial pieces.

The Bicentennial dollars were the first of the three denominations to be struck for distribution to the public; these were coined beginning in February 1975. The silver pieces were struck at San Francisco beginning on April 23, 1975. The Mint found that the copper nickel dollar was striking indistinctly, a problem not seen with the silver pieces. Brooks called a halt in production to allow Gasparro to modify the dies; the most noticeable change is that the revised issue, or Type II as it came to be known, have narrower, sharper lettering on the reverse. All silver pieces (struck only at San Francisco) are Type I; all three mints struck both Type I and Type II copper nickel pieces. All dollars included in 1975 proof sets are Type I; all those included in 1976 proof sets are Type II. The first Bicentennial dollars were released into circulation on October 13, 1975. Over 220 million were struck. The Bicentennial design was not used after 1976; sets of silver clad Bicentennial coins were sold by the Mint until sales were finally closed at the end of 1986.

One proof Bicentennial coin in silver clad and lacking a mint mark, similar to the dollar in the prototype set given to President Ford, is known. This piece supposedly came from a cash register drawer at the Woodward & Lothrop department store in Washington, D.C. Thomas K. DeLorey, who was then a reporter for Coin World, spoke to the discoverer and was suspicious of the story, thinking it more likely the coin was surreptitiously obtained from the government. He declined to question the origin then, fearing it might be seized and, therefore, not available to numismatists. The piece brought almost $30,000 by private sale in 1987.

=== Final years and replacement (1977–1978) ===
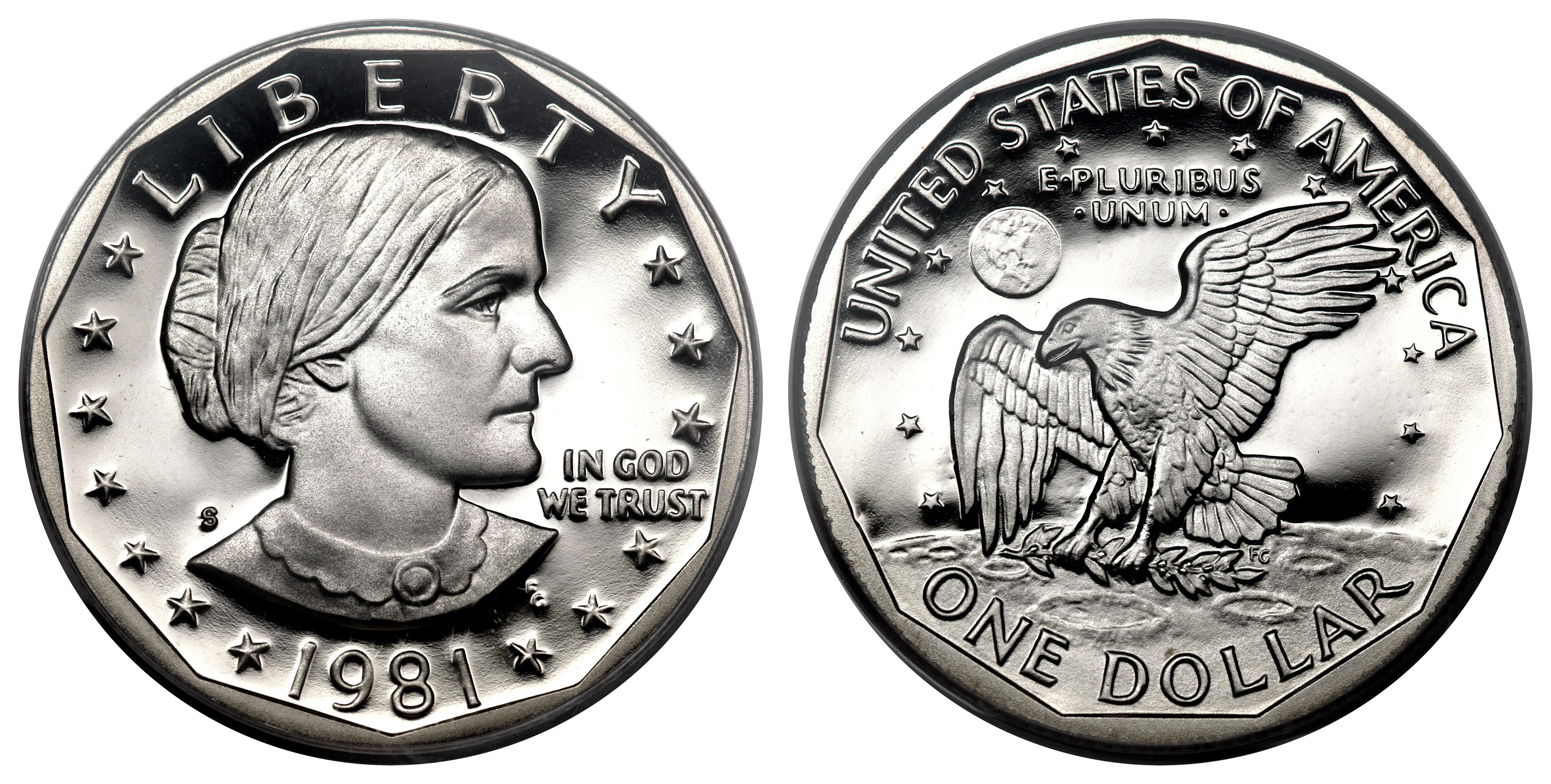
The Susan B. Anthony dollar

By 1975, the Treasury was concerned about the drain on resources from striking the dollar, which did not circulate. It engaged a private firm to study the six current denominations of U.S. coinage, and make recommendations. The firm concluded in its report that the Eisenhower dollar was too large and heavy to circulate effectively, but if the diameter was reduced by about a third, and the weight by two-thirds, it might be used. That report found that "the Eisenhower dollar has not been widely accepted by the public because of its large size and weight". In January 1977, just prior to leaving office, Ford's Treasury Secretary, William E. Simon, proposed the elimination of the cent and half dollar, and a reduction in size of the dollar. According to Bowers, the Treasury had come to believe that a coin as large as the Eisenhower dollar simply would not circulate in the United States.

The Mint struck pattern pieces of the smaller size, with various shapes and compositions. An 11-sided coin was considered, which would have differentiated it from the quarter, but the patterns would not work in vending machines. Such exotic metals as titanium were considered before the Mint decided on the standard clad composition. Gasparro prepared, for the circulating pieces, a design showing Liberty with flowing hair, similar to early American coins.

As the Eisenhower dollar awaited its demise, approximately 50 million per year were struck, using the eagle design for the reverse. In both years, the majority coined were at Denver. No silver collector's edition was issued; the blue and brown Ikes ended with 1974.

The new Treasury Secretary, Michael Blumenthal, supported Gasparro's design in testimony before Congress; Wisconsin Senator William Proxmire dubbed Blumenthal's position a "cop-out". Proxmire refused to introduce the bill, which would have left the choice of design up to Blumenthal or his successor, instead introducing his own legislation to commemorate early women's rights leader Susan B. Anthony. Many in the new Congress and in the Carter Administration were social progressives, and supported women's lib. Ohio Representative Mary Rose Oakar also introduced legislation for a Susan B. Anthony dollar in October 1978; it proceeded rapidly through Congress and was signed by President Jimmy Carter. Gasparro was given photographs of Anthony and told to reproduce her appearance exactly on the coin. Anthony's stern expression caused some to dub it the "Susan B. Agony" dollar. The Eisenhower dollar's reverse was used for the Anthony dollar. Convinced that the public would hoard the new pieces, the Mint Bureau produced half a billion before its official release to the public on July 2, 1979. It need not have worried; the public quickly rejected the new coin as too close in size and weight to the quarter dollar, and production for circulation ceased after 1980. Mint Director Stella Hackel Sims stated, "people are accustomed to the Eisenhower dollar, but in time, they'll become accustomed to the Susan". Attempts were made to give the new smaller dollars out as change in postal transactions, and to force their use by U.S. military personnel in Europe; both failed.

The Eisenhower dollar is the final regular-issue dollar coin to have been minted in silver (collectors and proof issues were minted with a purity of 40% Ag), the final dollar coin to be minted in the original large size, and the only circulating "large dollar" (that is, of the same 38mm diameter as earlier 90 percent dollar coins) to have been minted in cupronickel.

== Collecting ==
Appearance of the Earth on the 1972 Eisenhower dollar

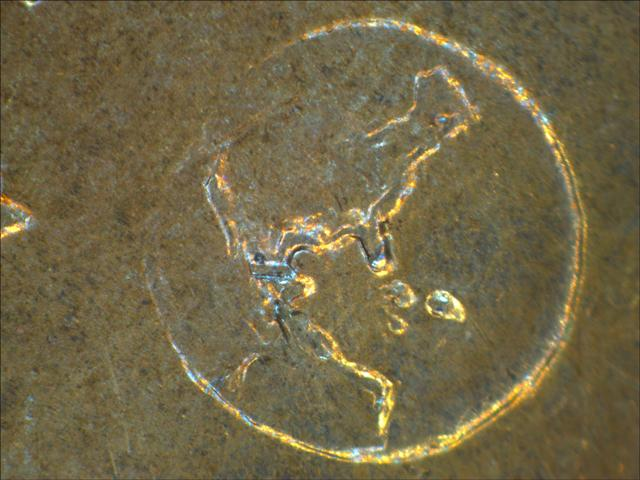
Type I

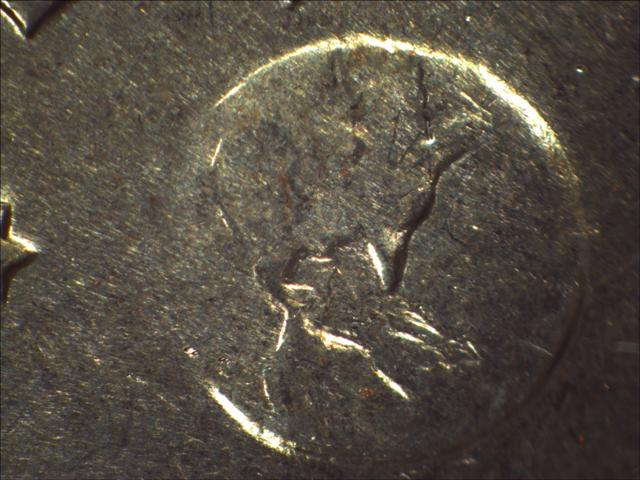
Type II

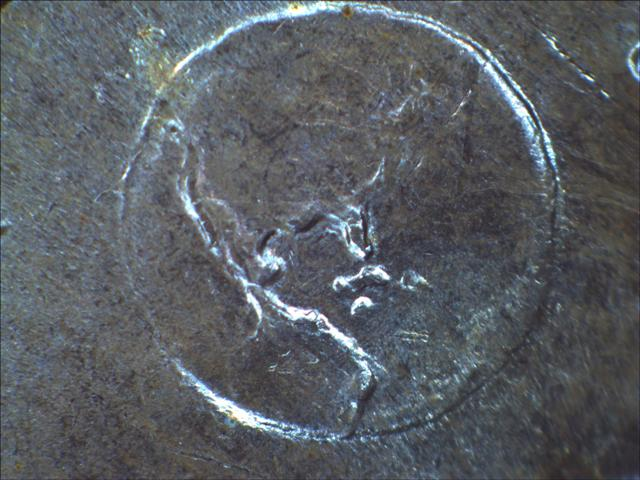
Type III

Collected by date and mint mark, no Eisenhower dollar is rare; as a result, the coins are relatively inexpensive and a complete set may be acquired without difficulty. However, many were badly struck, without full detail, especially in 1971 and 1972, and most pieces acquired nicks, scratches or "bag marks" from contact with each other soon after striking. Although lower-grade silver coins can be melted, this is not practical for Eisenhower dollars due to the lack of precious metal content, and dealers often try to get any premium they can on face value. Completing a set of highest-grade specimens may be difficult and expensive, especially for the 1971 and 1972 from Philadelphia or Denver, which were not sold in mint sets, and thus only came to collectors through banks. A 1973-D piece, tied with ten other specimens for the finest known of that date and mint mark in near-pristine MS-67 condition sold in June 2013 for $12,925. According to numismatic writer Steve Reach, "as more people submit modern-era coins like Eisenhower dollars for third-party certification, the true rarity of many issues in top-grades is becoming clear."

Some of the 1971-D pieces exhibit a variety in which (among several differences) the eagle lacks brow lines, these have been dubbed by Eisenhower dollar specialists the "Friendly Eagle Pattern". The 1972 dollar struck at Philadelphia is broken down into three varieties, which were made as Gasparro adjusted the design to take advantage of better steel being used in the Mint's dies. A midyear change in the design was announced by Brooks at the American Numismatic Association's 1972 convention in New Orleans, although she did not state exactly what was being changed. The three varieties may be differentiated by examining the depiction of the Earth on the reverse. Type I dollars show the Earth somewhat flattened, Florida pointing to the southeast, with the islands mostly to the southeast of the tip of the peninsula. The Earth is round and Florida points to the south on the Type II, with a single, large island to the southeast. The Type III is similar to the Type II, except that there are two islands directly to the south of the peninsula. The Type II is from a single reverse die, used in March 1972, and erroneously placed in service at Philadelphia—it is identical to and should have been used for the silver proof strikes at San Francisco. The Type III was placed in service, replacing the Type I, in September 1972. The Type I is most common; the Type III design was used in 1973 and after. The 1972 Type II is expensive in top grades, as is the 1776–1976 Type I from Philadelphia, which was only available in mint sets.

Some 1971-S proof pieces (and a few uncirculated 1971-S) have the serifs at the foot of the "R" in "LIBERTY" missing; this is dubbed the "peg leg" variety. The serifs are missing on all 1972-S, both uncirculated and proof. After the Mint obtained better steel for dies, the serifs returned for all of the remaining non-Bicentennial coinage, from all mints, though the leg of the R was shortened, and also for the Type II Bicentennial (the Type I lacks serifs on the R). Gasparro was often trying to improve the detail of Eisenhower's head during the coin's tenure, and as the R is the letter closest to it, these changes were most likely made in an effort to improve the flow of metal as the coins were struck.

In 1974 and again in 1977, the Denver Mint struck a small number of pieces on silver-clad planchets, or blanks. Both times, these came from planchets which had been shipped from the San Francisco Assay Office to Denver. The first ones in 1974 were found independently by two Las Vegas blackjack dealers. The 1974 planchets were initially intended to be used for "brown Ike" proof strikings; Mint policy then was that rejected silver proof planchets were to be used for uncirculated "blue Ikes", but these were placed in the bin for rejected copper-nickel proof planchets, intended to be shipped to be coined for circulation at Denver. The 1977 pieces resulted from pieces rejected for Bicentennial silver proof use, which were again placed in the wrong bin (they should have been melted, as the Mint was no longer striking silver uncirculated Eisenhower dollars). Between 10 and 20 of each date are known. Wexler, Crawford, and Flynn report an even rarer 1776–1976-D dollar in silver, but state that none have been offered at auction or submitted to the major coin grading services.

Bowers notes that the Morgan dollar (struck between 1878 and 1921) was not widely collected at the time, only to become very popular later, and suggests that one day, the turn of the Eisenhower dollar will come. Numismatist Charles Morgan said of the Eisenhower dollar in 2012,

It stands today as the greatest achievement in clad coinage in U.S. history. It was the most technically challenging coin ever attempted ... Researching the Eisenhower Dollar is vital for numismatic historians who want to understand what the post-silver era was like. The Eisenhower Dollar was a noble failure. In this respect, it truly is a perfect collectible coin.

== Mintage figures ==
Circulation strikes:

- 1971 47,799,000
- 1971-D 68,587,424
- 1972 75,890,000
- 1972-D 92,548,511
- 1973 1,769,258
- 1973-D 1,769,258
- 1974 27,366,000
- 1974-D 45,517,000

(No dollars dated 1975)

- 1776–1976 Type I 4,019,000
- 1776–1976-D Type I 21,048,710
- 1776–1976 Type II 113,318,000
- 1776–1976-D Type II 82,179,564
- 1977 12,596,000
- 1977-D 32,983,006
- 1978 25,702,000
- 1978-D 33,102,890

Uncirculated silver:

- 1971-S 6,868,530 ("blue Ike")
- 1972-S 2,193,056 ("blue Ike")
- 1973-S 1,883,140 ("blue Ike")
- 1974-S 1,900,156 ("blue Ike")
- 1776–1976-S 4,908,319 (3-coin Bicentennial set)

Proof:

- 1971-S silver 4,265,234 ("brown Ike")
- 1972-S silver 1,811,631 ("brown Ike")
- 1973-S clad 2,760,339 (Regular annual set)
- 1973-S silver 1,013,646 ("brown Ike")
- 1974-S clad 2,612,568 (Regular annual set)
- 1974-S silver 1,306,579 ("brown Ike")
- 1776–1976-S clad Type I 2,845,450 (1975 regular annual set)
- 1776–1976-S clad Type II 4,149,730 (1976 regular annual set)
- 1976-S silver 3,998,621 (3-coin Bicentennial set)
- 1977-S 3,251,152 (Regular annual set)
- 1978-S 3,127,781 (Regular annual set)

== See also ==
- Apollo 11 in popular culture

| Preceded by Peace dollar | Dollar coin of the United States; 1971–1978 | Succeeded by Susan B. Anthony dollar |
