= William H. Brett =

American civil servant

William Howard Brett

29th Director of the United States Mint
- In office July 1954 – January 1961
- President: Dwight D. Eisenhower
- Preceded by: Nellie Tayloe Ross
- Succeeded by: Eva Adams

Personal details
- Born: William Howard Brett; December 31, 1893 Cleveland, Ohio, U.S.
- Died: April 10, 1989 (aged 95) Palm Desert, California

Military service
- Allegiance: United States
- Branch/service: United States Army
- Battles/wars: First World War

William Howard Brett (December 31, 1893 – April 10, 1989) was an American government official and consultant who was Director of the United States Mint from 1954 to 1961.

== Biography ==
William H. Brett, the son of William Howard Brett, was a native of Cleveland. He served in the United States Army during World War I and was educated at Dartmouth College. After college, he returned to Ohio and went into business.

In 1954, President Dwight D. Eisenhower nominated Brett to be Director of the United States Mint, and Brett held this post from July 1954 to January 1961. He was a contestant on What's My Line? on November 25, 1956. Brett was also a contestant on the game show "To Tell The Truth" dated August 13, 1957. After retiring from the Mint, Brett served as a financial consultant.

Brett died of pancreatic cancer at his home in Palm Desert, California on April 10, 1989.

Government offices
Preceded by Nellie Tayloe Ross	Director of the United States Mint; July 1954 – January 1961	Succeeded by Eva Adams
