= Eva Adams =

Director of the United States Mint

30th Director of the United States Mint
- In office October 1961 – August 1969
- President: John F. Kennedy; Lyndon B. Johnson; Richard Nixon
- Preceded by: William H. Brett
- Succeeded by: Mary Brooks

Personal details
- Born: September 10, 1908 Wonder, Nevada, U.S.
- Died: August 23, 1991 (aged 82) Reno, Nevada, U.S.
- Parents: Verner Lauer Adams; Cora Varble
- Occupation: Senatorial Administrative Assistant; Director of the United States Mint; Assistant to Chairman of Mutual of Omaha

Eva Bertrand Adams (September 10, 1908 – August 23, 1991) was an American government official who was the director of the United States Mint from 1961 to 1969.

== Biography ==
Eva Bertrand Adams was born in Wonder, Nevada, on September 10, 1908, the daughter of Verner Laur Adams and his wife Cora (Varble) Adams. During Eva's childhood, the Adams family moved around the state often as her father was called out to work to set up numerous facilities in mining camps for Wingfield. These facilities included hotels, commissaries, and bars. Owing to the frequent re-locating in her early years she learned independence and how to make friends easily, and adapted to be happy wherever she was. Eventually Adams' mother insisted the family settle down in Reno, Nevada. Adams graduated from Reno High School at age 14. She then attended the University of Nevada, Reno, where she was a member of Kappa Alpha Theta, graduating in 1928, at age 19.

After graduating from college, Adams moved to Las Vegas, Nevada, to become an English teacher at Las Vegas High School. During this time, she became involved with the Clark County Democratic Party and was introduced to Pat McCarran.

She returned to Nevada in 1940 to briefly join the English department of the University of Nevada. Adams also served as Assistant Dean of Women at the university. Reno; shortly thereafter, McCarran, by now United States Senator for Nevada, invited her to move to Washington, D.C., to become his Administrative Assistant. Eva Adams also attended law school in Washington D.C. while working for Senator McCarran at the time. She graduated from the Washington College of Law and George Washington University, receiving an LL.B and Master's in Law from each institution respectively. She became a member of the Nevada and District of Columbia Bars, and for her efforts, she was admitted to practice before the Supreme Court in 1954. She worked for Senator McCarran until his death in 1954. She then worked for McCarran's successor, Ernest S. Brown, in 1954, and Alan Bible from 1954 to 1960.

In 1961, President of the United States John F. Kennedy named Adams Director of the United States Mint, and Adams subsequently held that office from October 1961 until August 1969. For her grandeurs efforts and achievements at the Mint, Adams was reappointed as director by President Lyndon B. Johnson in 1966. In 1983, she was quoted at a reception to honour the publishing of her oral history, "you know, in my day in Washington, a woman administrative assistant was expected to: Dress like a queen, act like a lady, think like a man, work like a dog.” During Ms. Adams' service as a female secretary, society kept women to such gender stereotypes. They were supposed to have a lady's mannerisms but a man's work ethic.

Adams was recommended by Senator Bible because of her previous knowledge and experience on precious metals, growing up as the daughter of a gold miner and watching the process of miners processing silver back in Wonder, Nevada. She was the second woman to hold the title of Director at the Mint, where she had a significant impact. She cleaned up processes and made them more efficient. The Mint was able formulate a copper-nickel clad composition for coinage, substituting out the silver which was order by Congress to be removed from coins, since they cost more than the coins in their face value She was instrumental in solving a coin shortage crisis in an economy surging back from a recession at the time, creating a new composition which made coins cheaper to produce. During her time there, they added approximately 100 new coin presses, as described in her article on the "Changes in Coinage". She was present during The Coinage Act of 1965, which eliminated silver from the American dime and quarter. She also helped plan the opening of the current Philadelphia Mint in 1969. Once the Mint was operating, Adams resigned. This was primarily because President Nixon put pressure on Adams to leave, since he wanted a Republican as the director.

Following her career at the Mint, Adams was the assistant to the chairman of Mutual of Omaha. She did this until 1978. During this time, she was also named director of the Medallic Art Company of New York City and served on the American Numismatic Association board of governors from 1971 to 1975.

Adams died in Reno on August 23, 1991, at the age of 82. She served the US mint for eight years, and is said by the funeral home to have died of natural causes.

== Education ==
Eva Adam's education
Degree	Institution	Year
Bachelor of Arts	University of Nevada	1928
Master's degree in English	Columbia University	1936
Bachelor of Laws Degree	American University	1948
Master in Law	George Washington University	1952
Doctorate in Law	American University	Unknown

== Awards and distinctions ==
- The Alumni Achievement Award at the George Washington University (1962)
- Distinguished Nevadan Award at the University of Nevada (1963)
- Exceptional Service Award from Treasury Department (1966)
- The Alumni Achievement Award at the American University Washington College of Law (1970)
- Nevada's Outstanding Women of the Century (1973)
- NLG "Clemy" Award (1974)
- ANA Medal of Merit (1984)
- Nevada Women's Fund Hall of Fame (1985)
- Elected into ANA Hall of Fame (1986)

Government offices
Preceded by William H. Brett	Director of the United States Mint; October 1961 – August 1969	Succeeded by Mary Brooks
