= Felix Flying Hawk =

Felix Flying Hawk (1881–1944) was an Oglala Lakota Wild Wester, interpreter, photographer and rancher. Felix Flying Hawk was the only son of Chief Flying Hawk and Goes Out Looking. "The Story of Felix Flying Hawk: Rustler Victim" was published by Major Israel McCreight in 1943 about an Indian arrested for stealing his own horses and attesting to the honesty and integrity of Native Americans. Felix Flying Hawk's eldest son, David Flying Hawk, traveled with his grandfather Chief Flying Hawk as a performer with Wild West shows.

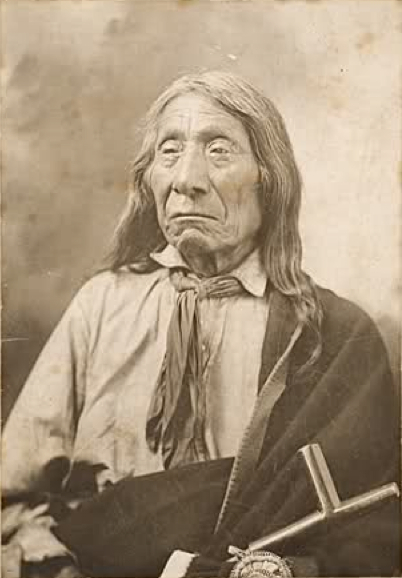
Chief Red Cloud, 1905, by Felix Flying Hawk

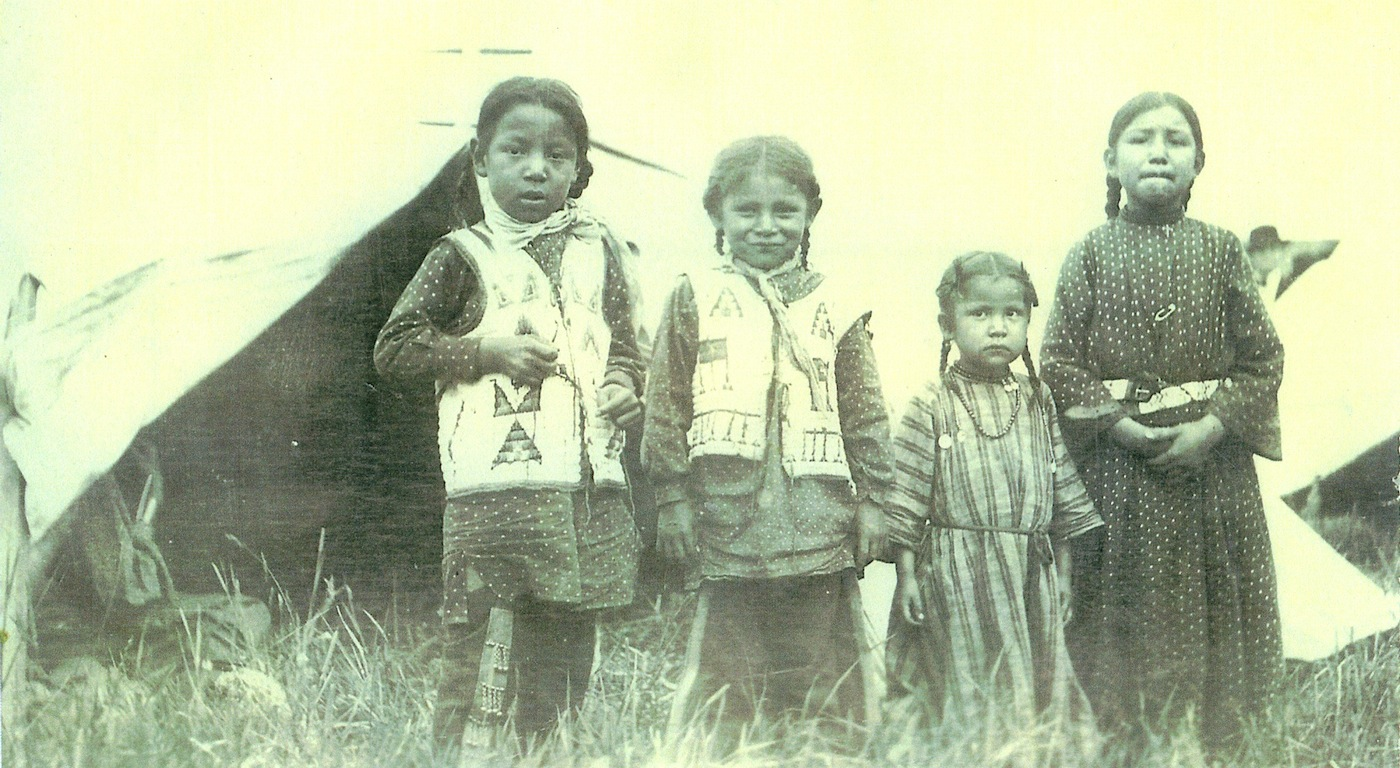
Children of Felix Flying Hawk, Du Bois, Pennsylvania, June 22, 1908. Left to right: David, Robert, Lucille and Eva.

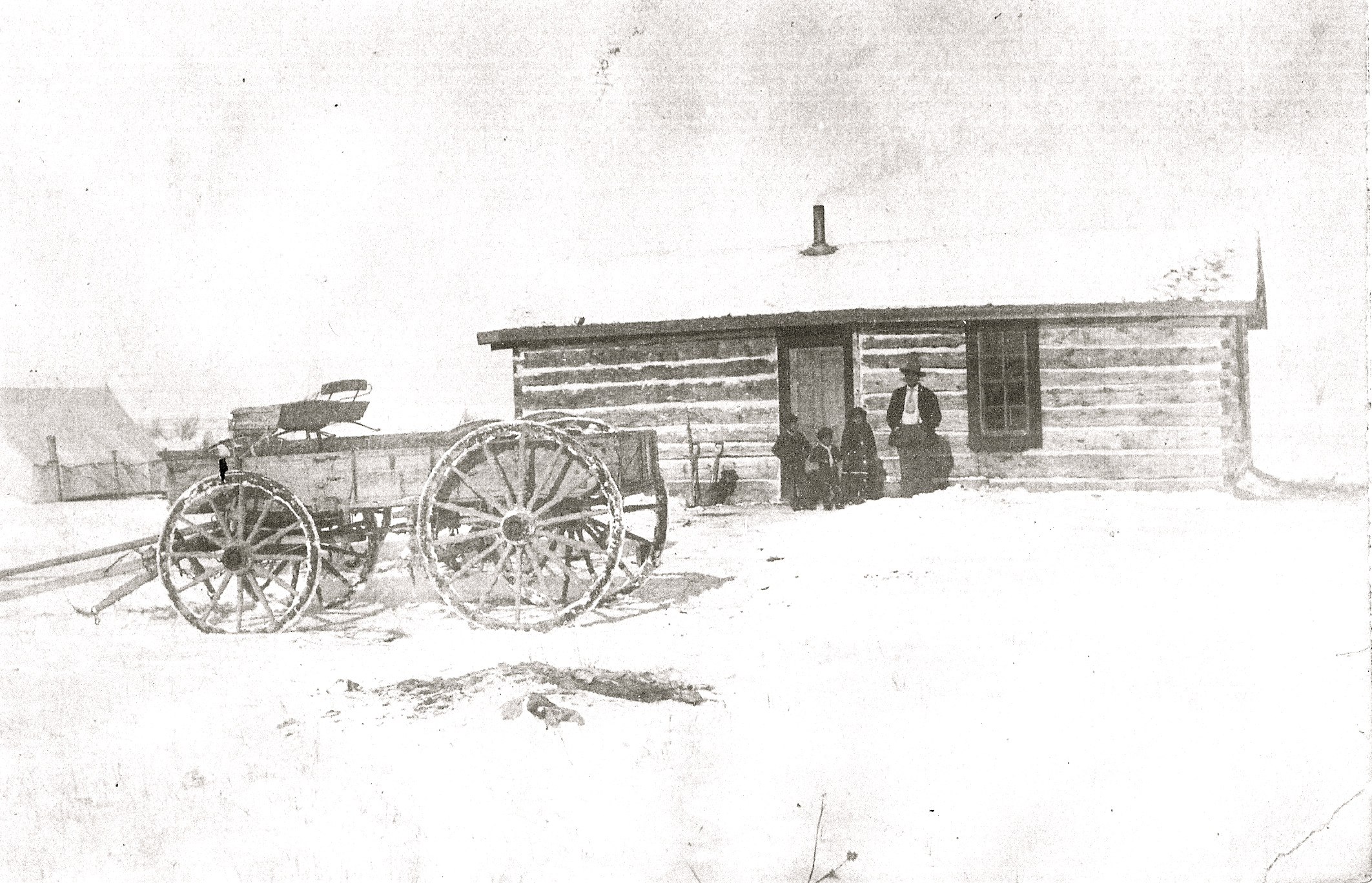
Home of Felix Flying Hawk, Manderson, South Dakota

Felix Flying Hawk accompanied Chief Flying Hawk on his travels throughout the United States with Buffalo Bill and his Wild West. Felix was an excellent photographer and his most circulated photograph is of the legendary Oglala Lakota Chief Red Cloud taken in 1905. "The Story of Felix Flying Hawk: Rustler Victim" was published by Major Israel McCreight in 1943. Felix owned a small ranch in Manderson-White Horse Creek, South Dakota, and was arrested for stealing his own horses in the early 1900s. The story is about a special encounter with Major Israel McCreight attesting to the honesty and integrity of the Native American. McCreight described his conversation about Felix Flying Hawk with the famous American writer, publisher, artist, and philosopher Elbert Hubbard:

Elbert Hubbard and the writer sat at the small table in The Pennsylvania Society rehearsing mutual old time experiences in the west, particularly, tales relating, and had himself been adopted into the tribe, but recently. Memory may be slightly at fault, but as now recalled, there were a couple of champagne glasses, partly full, on the same table. The letter from Felix, apologizing for the delay of repaying a $30 loan and explaining how he had made a trip to Rapid and found the letter which had lain in the post office for months, how he had corrected the address, got it on its way to discharge his obligation, this letter had just come in the afternoon mail; the writer drew it from his pocket and handed it to Hubbard to read. When he had completed the reading, and asked a few pertinent questions about the author, he folded it and deliberately placed it in his own pocket, saying it would be the subject of a new A Message to Garcia which he was going to write. Before he had accomplished this planned project for the thrill and edification of his world-wide fraternity of readers, the RMS Lusitania took America's greatest modern writer and philosopher to the bottom of the sea on May 17, 1915.

== David Flying Hawk ==
=== A Horse Named "King Tut" ===
David Flying Hawk was the eldest son of Felix Flying Hawk. David was a performer with Wild West shows and traveled with his grandfather Chief Flying Hawk. In 1924, David Flying Hawk performed in Rhode Island and had a notable encounter with a horse named "King Tut." "King Tut was a big bay, very rank horse, that we bought at Tribune, Kansas. The real King Tut's tomb had been discovered along about this time and papers were still carrying quite a bit of news about it, therefore the name King Tut. The horse had been bucked away from a snubbing horse a few times and we thought he would develop; into a real good, tough bucking horse. A lot of the credit for getting ole Tut started on the road to becoming a great horse must go to a Sioux Indian boy by the name of Dave Flying Hawk, who was on the Knights of Columbus rodeo with us in 1924. This Indian and two others, of the carload that was with us, were bronc riders. Dave was also part of the Indian dance troupe. The program for our opening performance in Providence, Rhode Island was somewhat in turmoil. The Indian dancers had just finished when the arena director, Sammy Garrett, started calling for Flying Hawk to come to the bucking chutes, that his horse was in. King Tut, being pretty wild. Had gone into the chutes first. There being no time for Flying Hawk to change clothes, he came to the chutes in full dance costume—fringed buckskin clothes, feathers, bells—the whole works. While the chute help saddled the big wild King Tut, who hadn't been to town any more than the Indian had, Flying Hawk put on someone's boots and spurs and eased up over the chute and down onto Tut's back. When they opened the chute gate and those bells started ringing and those feathers started flopping, that horse went completely berserk. The kid weathered the storm for about five jumps before he went into orbit. It looked as though someone had shot a wild turkey—the crowd went wild. They thought that it was a special act that Flying Hawk was putting on. That was the funniest thing I’ve ever seen happened at a rodeo. We sold King Tut, along with four or five top horses, to McCarty and Elliott of Cheyenne the next year. I heard a few years ago that they bucked him until he was nearly twenty-six years old, but I'm sure that he was never as scared in his life as we was with Flying Hawk on board."

=== The Arrest of David Flying Hawk ===
On March 25, 1927, Chief Flying Hawk wrote Major Israel McCreight for assistance, reporting that David had been arrested and jailed for horse stealing. McCreight well recalled the story of David’s father, Felix Flying Hawk, jailed in the early 1900s for stealing his own horses, and the injustice visited upon Native Americans. However, despite McCreight’s considerable efforts, David spent almost a year in county jails. The impact on David’s family was catastrophic, and without his help, Felix’s farm failed. Felix wrote McCreight. "And they make spoil my family no farm on this year, because my son David was in jail and nobody can not help to work on our farm, and also David's sister, age 20 years, she was dead on May 15, 1927, for I am sorry everythings." McCreight reported that, "My investigation shows that he was charged with stealing ponies, two having come into his possession in a trade in which he sold to some horse buyers without having changed the brands. It is only one more of the many examples of persecution of the poor red man by the grafting, cowardly, agency officials. There seems little or no legal remedy for it." David Flying Hawk later became Treaty Chairman of the South Dakota and Seven Camp Fires, pursuing the United States Government for broken treaty obligations.

== Felix Flying Hawk and Major Israel McCreight ==
Felix Flying Hawk wrote letters on behalf of his father Chief Flying Hawk and corresponded with McCreight from 1912 until 1944. The letters are a part of the "Major Israel McCreight Archives" at the Du Bois Area Historical Society

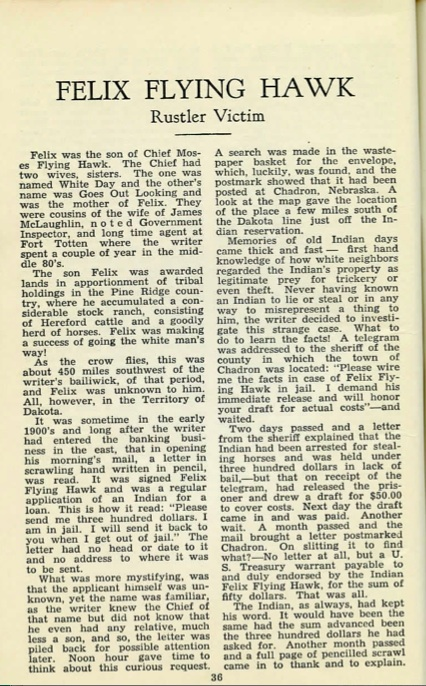

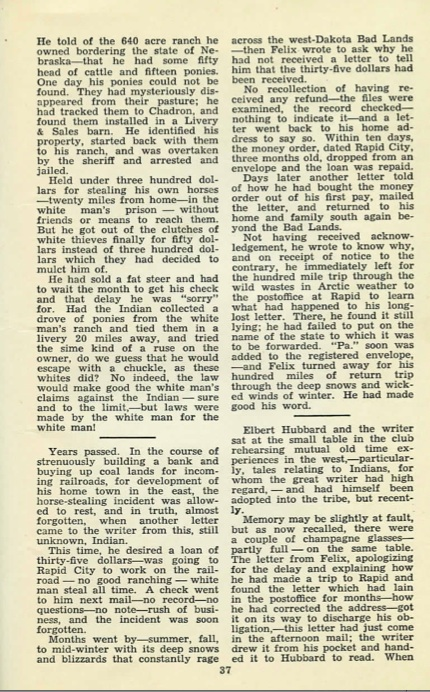

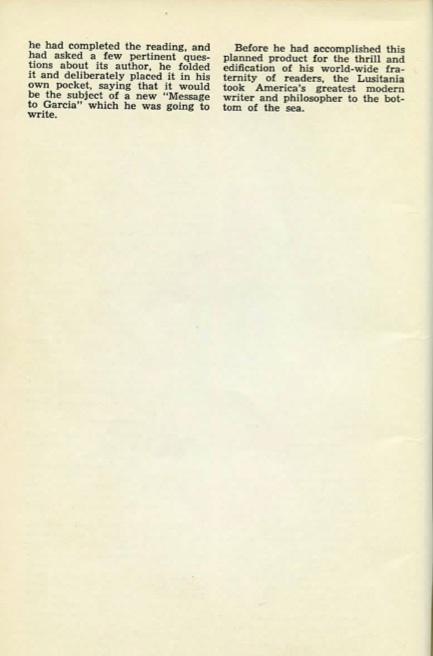
