= Manderson-White Horse Creek, South Dakota =

Manderson-White Horse Creek, South Dakota Oyúȟpe
- CDP
- Location in Oglala Lakota County and the state of South Dakota
- Coordinates: 43°14′36″N 102°29′32″W
- Country: United States
- State: South Dakota
- County: Oglala Lakota
- Civil township: East Oglala Lakota Unorganized Territory

Area
  - Total: 5.73 sq mi (14.85 km^{2})
  - Land: 5.73 sq mi (14.85 km^{2})
  - Water: 0 sq mi (0.00 km^{2})
- Elevation: 3,248 ft (990 m)

Population (2020)
  - Total: 554
  - Density: 96.6/sq mi (37.31/km^{2})
- Time zone: UTC-7 (Mountain (MST))
  - Summer (DST): UTC-6 (MDT)
- Area code: 605
- FIPS code: 46-40550
- GNIS feature ID: 2393117

Manderson-White Horse Creek or Oyúȟpe (Lakota: Oyúȟpe; the name of a band of the Oglala) is a census-designated place in East Oglala Lakota Unorganized Territory, South Dakota (civil township equivalent) in Oglala Lakota County, South Dakota, United States. The population was 554 at the 2020 census.

Oglala Lakota tribesman, Kicking Bear died here on May 28, 1904. He fought in several battles during the Black Hills War, including Battle of the Greasy Grass. His nephew, Felix Flying Hawk owned a ranch.

According to the Federal Writers' Project, the origin of the name Manderson is obscure.

== Geography ==
According to the United States Census Bureau, the CDP has a total area of 5.7 square miles or 14.8 square kilometres, all land.

== Climate ==
Like most of South Dakota, Oyúȟpe has a relatively dry humid continental climate (Köppen Dfa) with summers featuring very warm to hot afternoons and pleasant mornings, and generally freezing, though very variable, winters. Winter weather, like all of the West River region, is dominated by the extreme temperature conflicts between warm chinook winds that bring temperatures above 50 °F or 10 °C on an average of seventeen afternoons during the three winter months, and cold Arctic air that brings an average of 19.5 mornings below 0 °F or −17.8 °C. The dryness of the winter limits snowfall and the chinooks further limit snow depth, which exceeds 1 inch or 0.025 meters on only 41.8 days each year.

Summer weather is generally very warm, although during dry spells when the upper-level anticyclone moves northward, long periods of sweltering and arid weather may occur: the hottest month was August 1983 with a daily mean of 78.6 °F or 25.9 °C and the hottest temperature on record 110 °F or 43.3 °C on July 2 of 1990.

Climate data for Manderson 3 NE, South Dakota (1971–2000), extremes 1949–2001
Month	Jan	Feb	Mar	Apr	May	Jun	Jul	Aug	Sep	Oct	Nov	Dec	Year
Record high °F (°C)	66 (19)	70 (21)	82 (28)	93 (34)	95 (35)	105 (41)	110 (43)	104 (40)	102 (39)	93 (34)	83 (28)	69 (21)	110 (43)
Mean daily maximum °F (°C)	34.8 (1.6)	40.6 (4.8)	48.3 (9.1)	58.3 (14.6)	68.0 (20.0)	78.7 (25.9)	86.8 (30.4)	87.0 (30.6)	77.2 (25.1)	64.0 (17.8)	46.4 (8.0)	37.6 (3.1)	60.6 (15.9)
Daily mean °F (°C)	22.9 (−5.1)	28.4 (−2.0)	36.7 (2.6)	45.9 (7.7)	56.2 (13.4)	66.3 (19.1)	73.1 (22.8)	72.6 (22.6)	62.2 (16.8)	49.7 (9.8)	34.2 (1.2)	25.6 (−3.6)	47.8 (8.8)
Mean daily minimum °F (°C)	11.0 (−11.7)	16.2 (−8.8)	25.0 (−3.9)	33.5 (0.8)	44.4 (6.9)	53.8 (12.1)	59.4 (15.2)	58.1 (14.5)	47.2 (8.4)	35.3 (1.8)	21.9 (−5.6)	13.6 (−10.2)	35.0 (1.7)
Record low °F (°C)	−28 (−33)	−31 (−35)	−18 (−28)	5 (−15)	23 (−5)	33 (1)	38 (3)	37 (3)	19 (−7)	−8 (−22)	−19 (−28)	−37 (−38)	−37 (−38)
Average precipitation inches (mm)	0.39 (9.9)	0.46 (12)	1.32 (34)	2.20 (56)	3.16 (80)	3.18 (81)	2.58 (66)	1.87 (47)	1.51 (38)	1.52 (39)	0.70 (18)	0.41 (10)	19.3 (490.9)
Average snowfall inches (cm)	6.9 (18)	6.1 (15)	10.8 (27)	3.5 (8.9)	0.4 (1.0)	0.0 (0.0)	0.0 (0.0)	0.0 (0.0)	trace	3.5 (8.9)	6.1 (15)	7.0 (18)	44.3 (113)
Average precipitation days (≥ 0.01 inch)	4.5	4.6	7.1	9.1	10.6	10.0	7.8	6.1	5.9	5.5	4.9	5.5	81.6
Average snowy days (≥ 0.1 inch)	3.8	2.8	3.6	1.6	0.1	0.0	0.0	0.0	0.0	1.1	2.9	3.8	19.7

== Demographics ==
Historical population
Census	Pop.	Note	%±
1990	243		—
2000	626		157.6%
2010	626		0.0%
2020	554		−11.5%
U.S. Decennial Census

As of the census of 2000, there were 626 people, 109 households, and 97 families residing in the CDP. The population density was 109.9 inhabitants per square mile (42.4/km^{2}). There were 116 housing units at an average density of 20.4/sq mi (7.9/km^{2}). The racial makeup of the CDP was 1.12% White, 98.72% Native American, and 0.16% from two or more races. Hispanic or Latino of any race were 1.76% of the population.

There were 109 households, out of which 61.5% had children under the age of 18 living with them, 30.3% were married couples living together, 48.6% had a female householder with no husband present, and 10.1% were non-families. 9.2% of all households were made up of individuals, and 1.8% had someone living alone who was 65 years of age or older. The average household size was 5.70 and the average family size was 5.99.

In the CDP, the population was spread out, with 52.9% under the age of 18, 10.9% from 18 to 24, 22.0% from 25 to 44, 10.9% from 45 to 64, and 3.4% who were 65 years of age or older. The median age was 17 years. For every 100 females, there were 100.0 males. For every 100 females age 18 and over, there were 83.2 males.

The median income for a household in the CDP was $8,229, and the median income for a family was $8,229. Males had a median income of $13,750 versus $13,750 for females. The per capita income for the CDP was $4,440. About 75.9% of families and 74.6% of the population were below the poverty line, including 92.3% of those under age 18 and 57.9% of those age 65 or over.

== See also ==
- List of census-designated places in South Dakota
