= Indian Head eagle =

United States $10 gold piece

Indian Head eagle ($10)
- United States
- Value: 10 United States dollars (1 eagle)
- Mass: 16.718 g
- Diameter: 26.92 mm
- Thickness: 2.023 mm
- Edge: Starred; 46 stars (1907–1911); 48 stars (1912–1933)
- Composition: 90% gold, 10% copper
- Gold: .48375 troy oz
- Years of minting: 1907–1933
- Mint marks: D, S. Located for 1908-D "No Motto" issues, above the leaves near the eagle's feet on the reverse; for all pieces with "IN GOD WE TRUST", to the left of the arrow on which the eagle stands Philadelphia Mint pieces lack mint mark.

Obverse
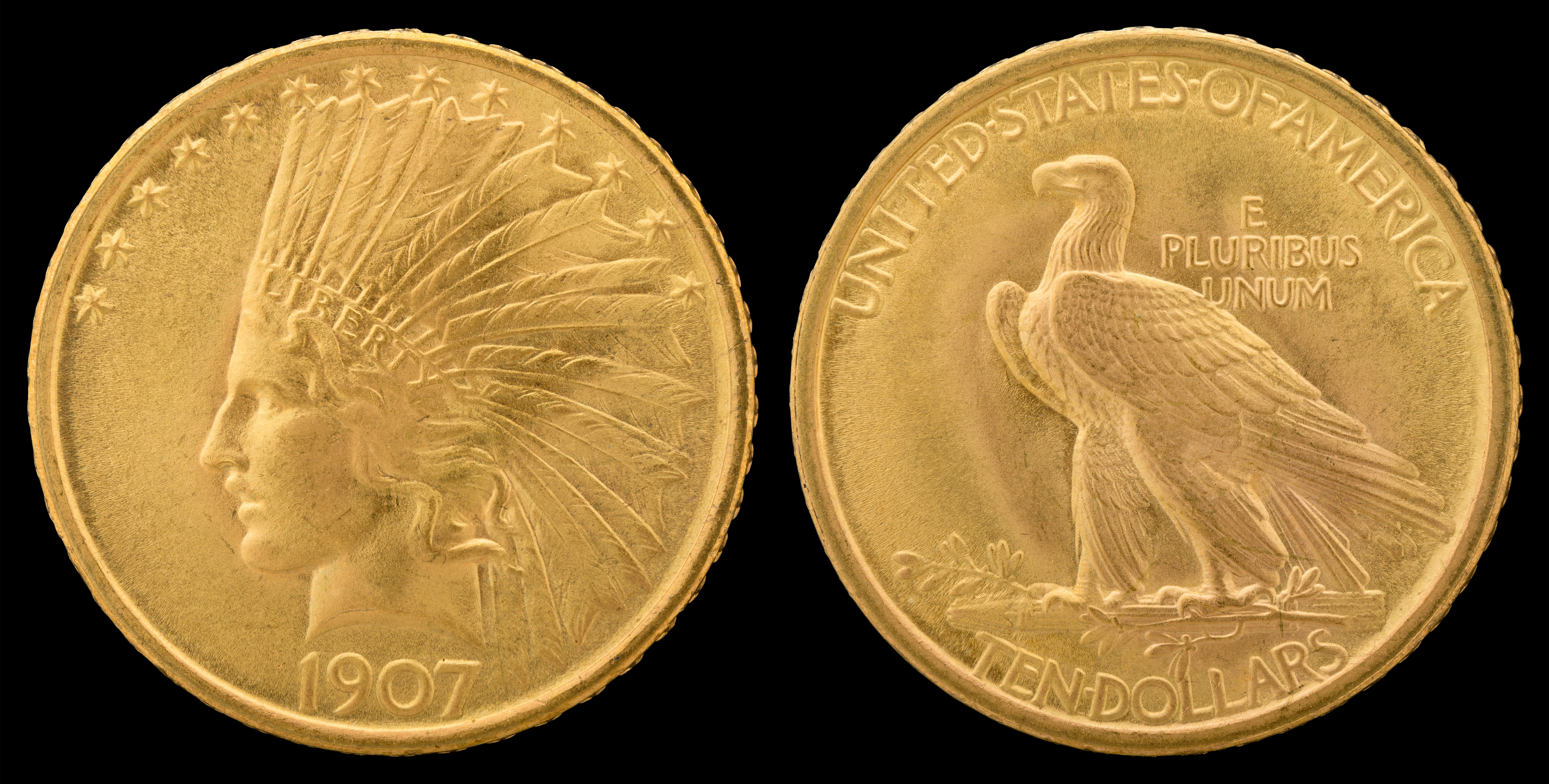
- Design: A left-facing bust of Liberty wearing an Indian feather headdress; 13 stars surmount the design
- Designer: Augustus Saint-Gaudens
- Design date: 1907
- Design discontinued: 1933

Reverse
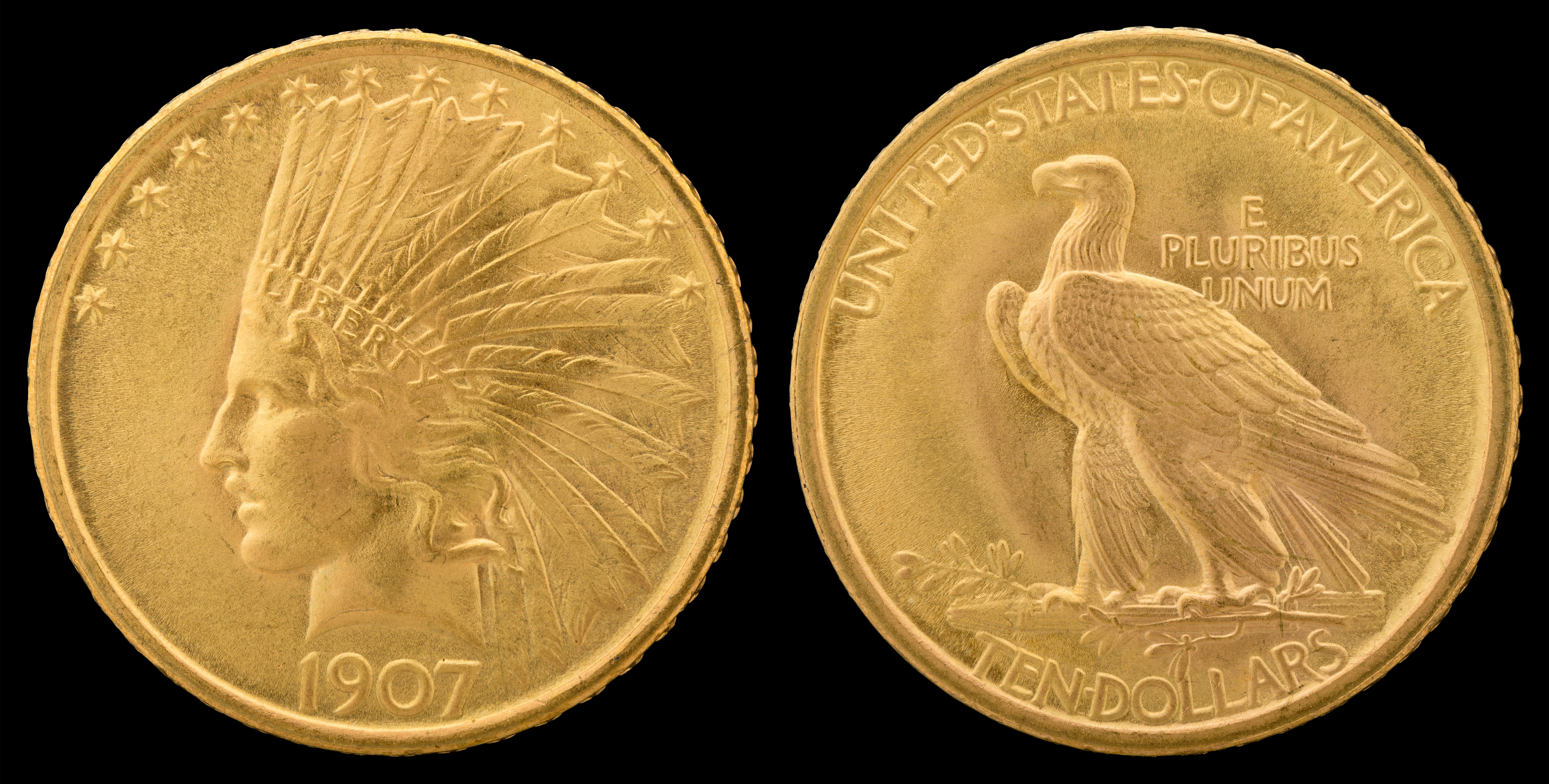
- Design: An eagle standing on a sheaf of arrows encircled by an olive branch. (dots before and after TEN DOLLARS and narrow rim only on some 1907 issues)
- Designer: Augustus Saint-Gaudens
- Design date: 1907
- Design discontinued: 1908
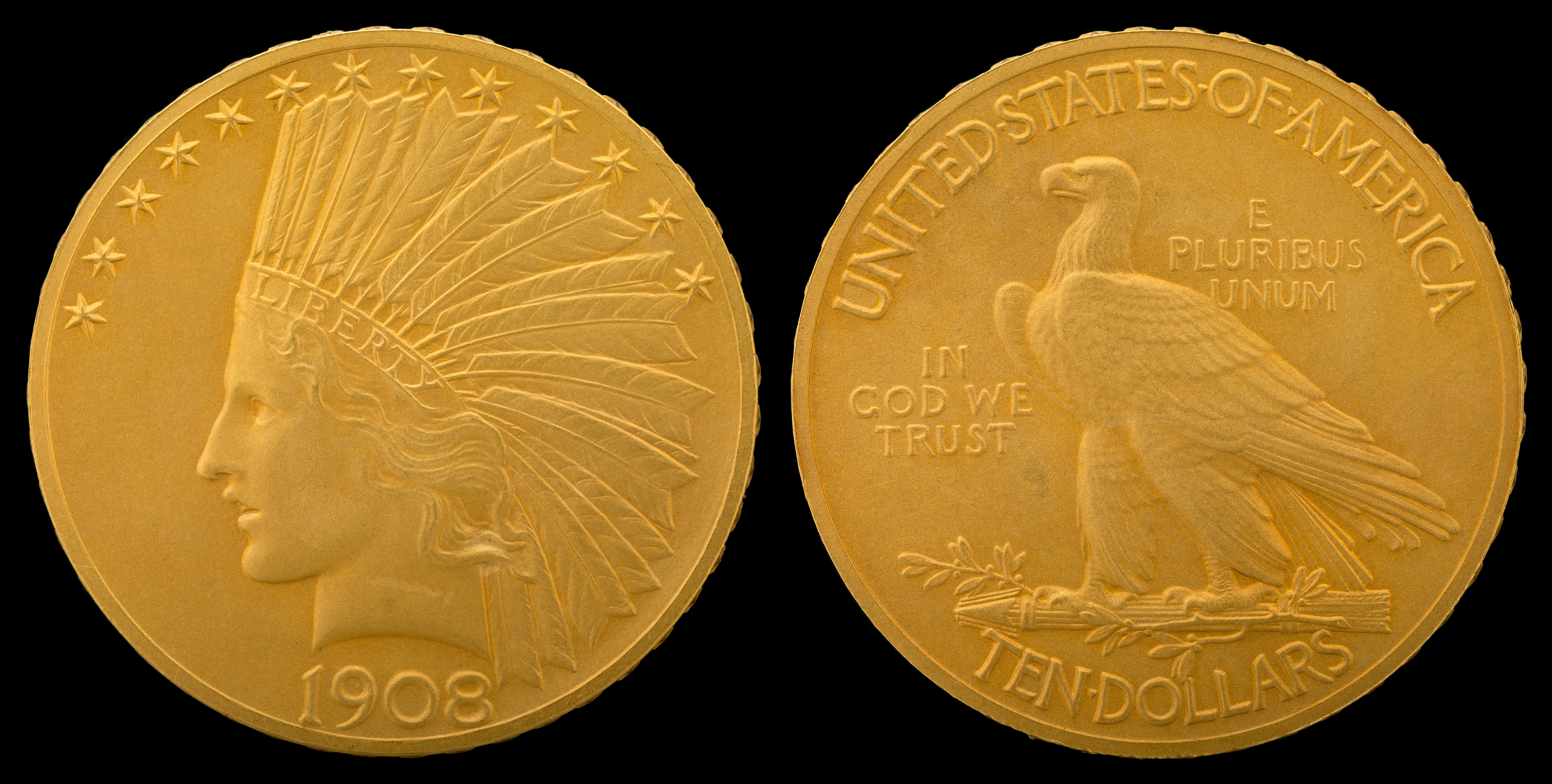
- Design: With "In God We Trust"
- Designer: Augustus Saint-Gaudens
- Design date: 1908
- Design discontinued: 1933

The Indian Head eagle is a $10 gold piece or eagle that was struck by the United States Mint continuously from 1907 until 1916, and then irregularly until 1933. The obverse and reverse were designed by sculptor Augustus Saint-Gaudens, originally commissioned for use on other denominations. He was suffering from cancer and did not survive to see the coins released.

Beginning in 1904, President Theodore Roosevelt proposed new, more artistic designs on US coins, prompting the Mint to hire Saint-Gaudens to create them. Roosevelt and Saint-Gaudens at first considered a uniform design for the four denominations of coins which were struck in gold, but in 1907 Roosevelt decided to use a model for the obverse of the eagle that the sculptor had meant to use for the cent. For the reverse of the $10 coin, the President decided on a design featuring a standing bald eagle that had been developed for the Saint-Gaudens double eagle $20 coin, while the obverse features a left-facing bust of Liberty wearing an Indian feather headdress.

The coin as sculpted by Saint-Gaudens was too high in relief for the Mint to strike readily, and it took months to modify the design so that the coin could be struck by one blow of the Mint's presses. Saint-Gaudens died on August 3, 1907, and Roosevelt insisted that the new eagle be finished and struck that month. New pieces were given to the President on August 31 which differ from the coins struck later for circulation.

The omission of the motto "In God We Trust" on the new coins caused public outrage, and prompted Congress to pass a bill mandating its inclusion. Mint Chief Engraver Charles E. Barber added the words and made minor modifications to the design. The Indian Head eagle was struck regularly until 1916, and then intermittently until President Franklin Roosevelt directed the Mint to stop producing gold coins in 1933. Its termination ended the series of eagles struck for circulation begun in 1795. Many Indian Head eagles were melted by the government in the late 1930s; the 1933 issue is a particular rarity, as few were distributed.

== Inception ==
In 1904, President Theodore Roosevelt wrote to Secretary of the Treasury Leslie Mortier Shaw complaining that U.S. coinage lacked artistic merit. He suggested that the treasury engage a private artist to prepare new coin designs, such as sculptor Augustus Saint-Gaudens. At Roosevelt's direction, the Mint hired Saint-Gaudens to redesign the cent and the four gold pieces: the double eagle ($20), eagle ($10), half eagle ($5), and quarter eagle ($2.50). The Liberty Head design had been first struck for the eagle in 1838; the last addition to the Liberty Head gold series was the double eagle, first struck for circulation in 1850. The designs of those pieces had remained unchanged for more than 25 years, and they could be changed without an act of Congress.

In 1905, Mint Engraver Charles E. Barber engraved the obverse of Roosevelt's inauguration medal, while his assistant George T. Morgan engraved the reverse. Roosevelt disliked the work and engaged Saint-Gaudens to design an unofficial medal commemorating the inauguration. Saint-Gaudens foresaw resistance from Barber on the question of the new coinage; he wrote to his brother Louis, "Barber is a S.O.A.B. [son of a bitch] but I had a talk with the President who ordered Secretary Shaw in my presence to cut Barber's head off if he didn't do our bidding".

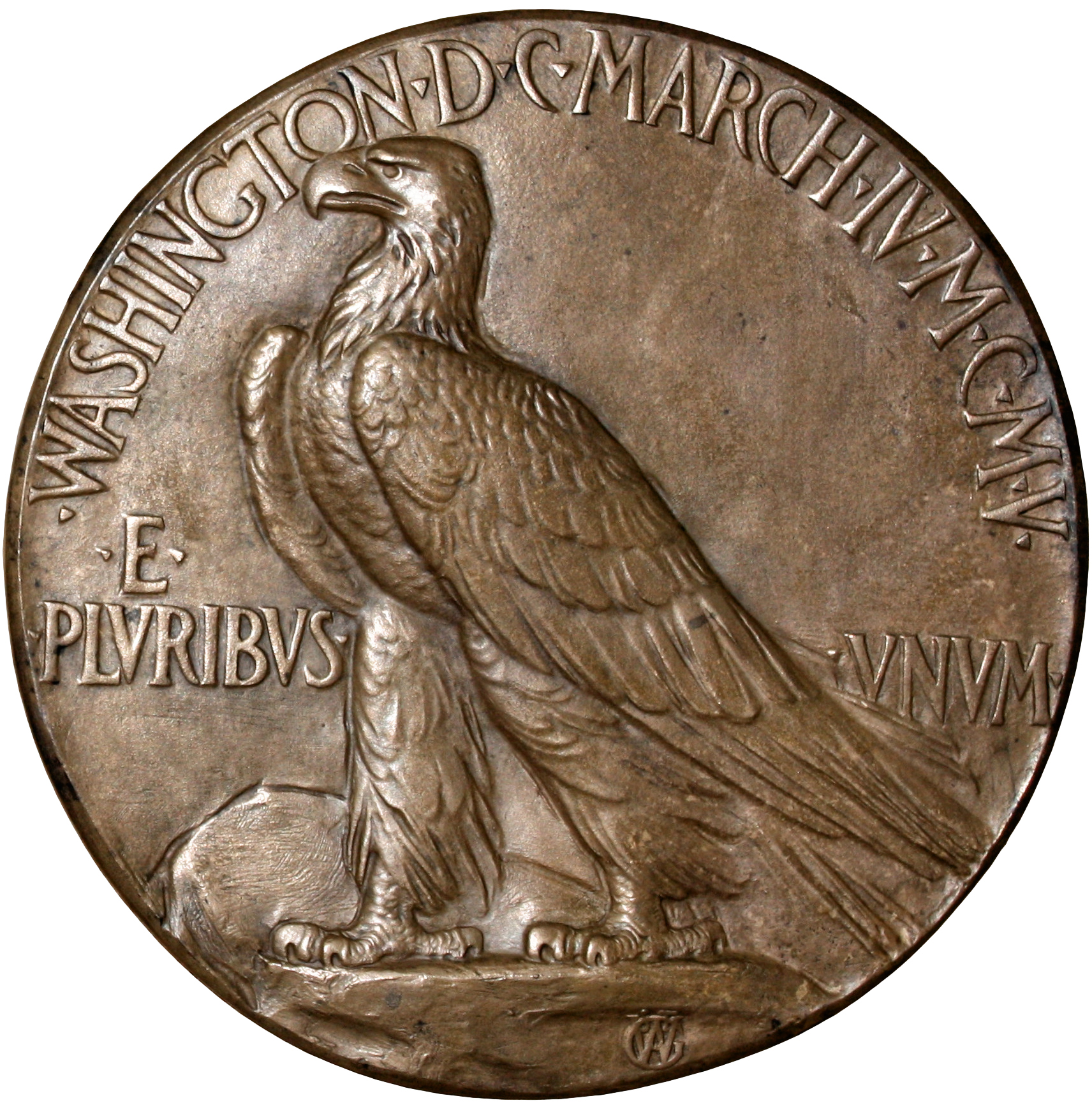
Saint-Gaudens's 1905 inaugural medal reverse contains a standing eagle similar to the one on the $10 piece.

Roosevelt was impressed by some models that Saint-Gaudens had prepared for the cent showing a head of Liberty. In early 1907, he wrote to Saint-Gaudens proposing that an Indian war bonnet be added to the obverse of the cent: "I feel very strongly that on at least one coin we ought to have the Indian feather headdress. It is distinctly American, and very picturesque. Couldn't you have just such a head as you have now, but with the feather headdress?" Numismatic historian Walter Breen describes this as "the absurd addition of a feathered warbonnet", and art historian Cornelius Vermeule states that the Indian Head eagle "missed being a great coin because Roosevelt interfered" with its design. Nonetheless, Saint-Gaudens added the headdress to the head of Liberty in February 1907. He was undecided about which design to use for the gold pieces, which were still intended to have a uniform appearance, and he proposed using the headdress Liberty for the double eagle. Roosevelt tentatively decided to use different designs on the eagle and double eagle, with the eagle to bear the headdress Liberty. The double eagle would show a Liberty striding forward, with a flying eagle on the reverse. The President was prepared to meet personally with Saint-Gaudens if he objected, but the sculptor was seriously ill with cancer and no meeting took place.

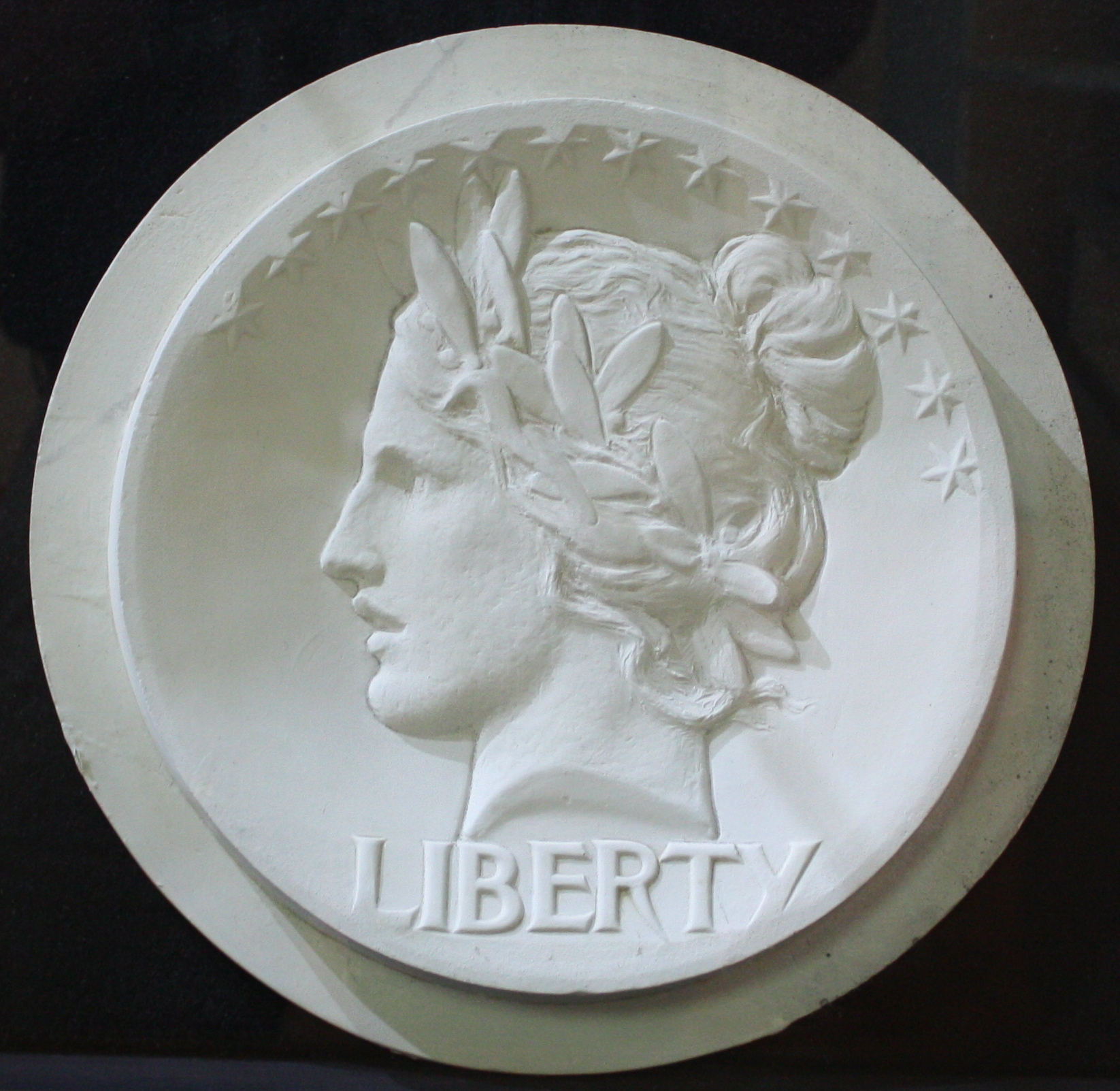
Saint-Gaudens's model of the Liberty design for the cent. Roosevelt insisted on adding a man's Indian feather headdress.

Mint Director George E. Roberts wrote to Saint-Gaudens on May 25, 1907: "It is now settled ... the design for the Eagle shall be the feather head of Liberty with the standing eagle". Saint-Gaudens and his assistants moved quickly on the revision, and he sent models of the new coin on June 1 with a letter stating that the relief of the new models should be coinable by the Mint. The double eagles were then being delayed because Saint-Gaudens had twice sent the Mint models with too high a relief that could not be struck in one blow, as required for circulating coinage. His letter was forwarded to the Philadelphia Mint, where Superintendent John Landis had Mint Chief Engraver Charles E. Barber read and initial it. On June 7, Barber responded to Landis:

I beg to report that I have received two models in plaster and also a copy of a letter from Mr. Saint-Gaudens to the Director, in which there are certain statements that are somewhat misleading ... the relief of the design must conform to the fixed conditions and therefore, the only relief that I knew of was coin relief; the models now sent are not coin relief. ... The date of the year is in Roman notation, there is no provision made for even next year, there being no place left, and as these coins have to stand for twenty-five years before another change can be made, I feel it necessary to state that within a few years it would be impossible to date the dies.

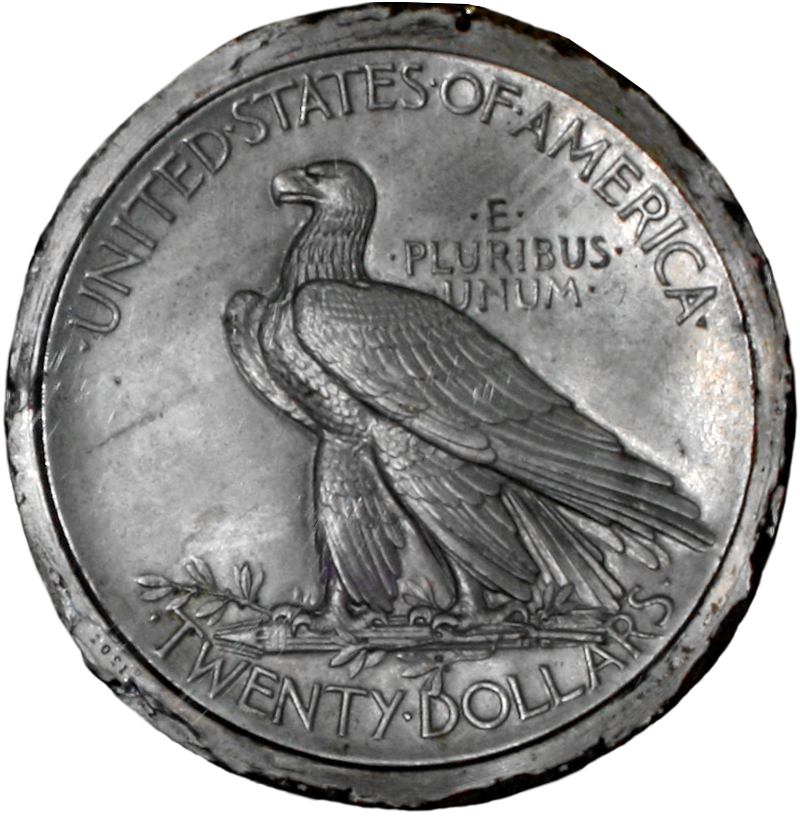
A metal model for the double eagle by Saint-Gaudens; the design was adapted for the eagle

Roberts wrote to Saint-Gaudens on June 11 suggesting that there might be problems with the date and the relief; he received no response and wrote again on June 18. This time the sculptor responded, writing that he had been awaiting the return of his assistant Henry Hering, who had handled much of the dealings with the Mint. He agreed that Roman numerals were ill-advised for the eagle, and he sent new models to the Mint on June 24. Barber used these models to prepare a die, along with a bronze casting which was produced privately, and the Mint struck experimental pieces on July 19. These "high relief" pieces required multiple strikes of the press to fully bring up the design. Saint-Gaudens wrote to the Mint in mid-July, "I am waiting to know about this in order to proceed with the other reliefs", and he was sent one of the new pieces, along with a Liberty Head eagle for comparison.

On July 19, Roberts sent a similar pair of coins to Secretary of the Treasury George Cortelyou, noting that Saint-Gaudens used a smooth finish to the design rather than the sharp die work characteristic of the Liberty gold pieces, and he suggested that this might encourage counterfeiting. Roberts communicated these concerns to Saint-Gaudens, who requested casts of the dies used to strike the new pieces; the casts were sent to his house in Cornish, New Hampshire on July 28. Saint-Gaudens died there of cancer on August 3, 1907, and Roosevelt wrote to his widow Augusta, "I count it as one of the privileges of my administration to have had him make two of our coins".

== Preparations ==
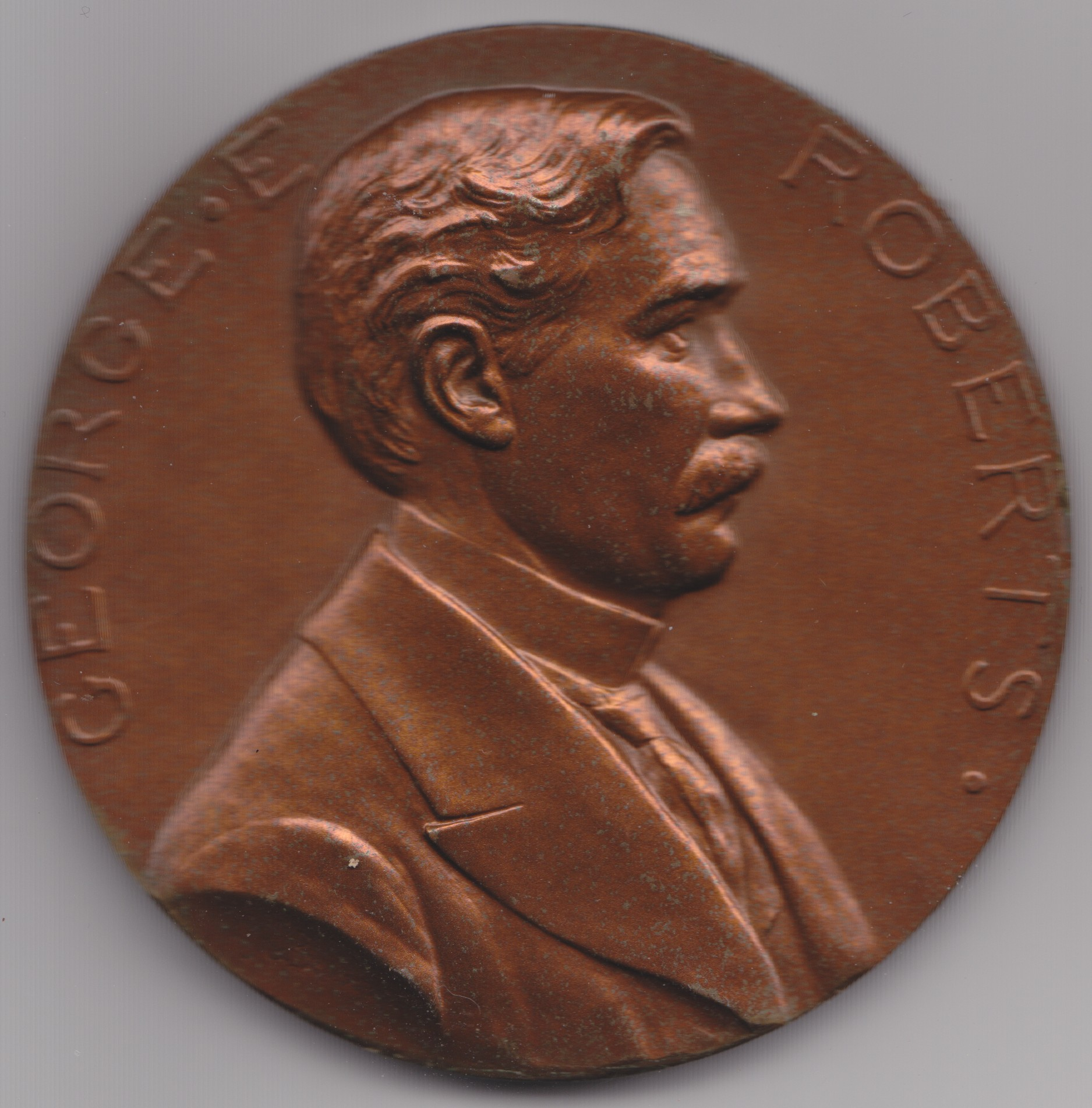
Mint Director George E. Roberts (shown on his Mint medal, designed by Barber) left office on July 31, 1907.

Roberts left office on July 31, 1907 to become president of the Commercial National Bank of Chicago. As his successor, San Francisco Mint Superintendent Frank A. Leach, did not take office until November 1, former Mint Director Robert Preston served as acting director in the interim.

On August 7, Roosevelt ordered Secretary Cortelyou to have the designs for the eagle and double eagle finalized and in production by September 1. With Landis on vacation, Cortelyou passed the President's letter on to the acting Philadelphia Mint superintendent, Dr. Albert A. Norris, instructing him to "have this matter taken up at once and the President's instructions carried out; and everything possible must be done to expedite the work." Preston wrote to Roberts, asking for information about the new coinage, and the former Mint director responded on August 12, outlining the correspondence with Saint-Gaudens, and noting that "no instructions have been received from the President as to the half and quarter eagle, but I expected that the eagle design would be used upon them ... The President concluded to leave the One Cent piece unchanged, and there has been no discussion about any change in the Nickel piece."

In response to the President's instructions, Barber wrote to Norris informing him that the design for the eagle had been awaiting approval since July, making no mention of the Mint's desire for sharper die work. Norris noted in his subsequent letter to Acting Director Preston that the Mint had been having trouble with the collar, which would strike the edge of the coin and impress 46 stars, representing the number of states there would be after Oklahoma's already scheduled admission to the Union later in 1907. Mint authorities had turned unsuccessfully to their counterparts in Paris for advice, but the Mint's machine shop was able to perfect the collar. Norris defended Barber in his letter to Preston,

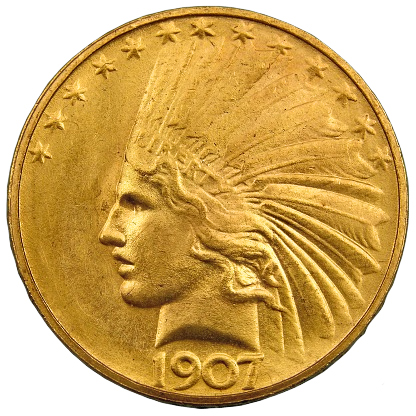
1907 "wire rim" eagle

I think the President does Mr. Barber an injustice when he speaks of "a certain cumbersomeness of mind and inability to do the speediest modern work, as shown by these delays," here. The making of the models for these coins was given to Saint Gaudens, who was a sculptor and had no experience with coinage designs. When the models were received, the Bureau [of the Mint] was notified that the dies made from them would not work in the coining press ... the models were returned to Saint Gaudens, at his request and a modified set furnished after some time. The Bureau was informed that even these would not make dies satisfactory for coinage, but the dies were made and it was found they could not be used in the coining press. How are we going to strike coins from these for the President?

In late August, Augusta Saint-Gaudens sent new models for the eagle to Acting Director Preston. When Barber examined them, he noted, "dies made from these models would be a great improvement over those already made" and stated that with these models, the Mint could have the eagle in full production within a month. Homer Saint-Gaudens, the sculptor's son, wrote to Preston, "Mr. Hering has finally finished the eagle at a relief slightly lower than that on the French [gold] coin by Chaplin, [sic, actually Chaplain] which is the lowest relief that Mr. Hering knew my father would abide by, and which I understand Mr. Barber can mint." In the meantime, Cortelyou ordered 500 pieces struck on the Mint's high-pressure medal press from the dies the Mint had from Saint-Gaudens's earlier efforts, thus complying with the letter of the President's August 7 order. Preston sent a note to Norris, warning that the President would likely order 100 pieces and suggesting that he have the coins available "so you can furnish them without a moment's delay". According to numismatic historian Roger Burdette, "these were an 'insurance policy', put in place by Cortelyou against additional presidential rage". The President viewed sample eagle coins on August 31, and expressed his satisfaction with them and his desire to see more struck.

As Saint-Gaudens's design did not include a rim (the raised surface which surrounds each side of a coin), excess metal was forming a "fin" or extrusion from the coin. The fin was easily broken off, and there was a threat that the eagles would quickly become underweight, diminishing their usefulness as a trade coin. Barber engraved a rim onto the die, eliminating the problem.

About five hundred pieces had been struck from Saint-Gauden's original dies; these were struck on the medal press and were for the most part distributed to government officials. They are referred to as "wire rim" pieces, denoting the sharp angle at which the field of the coin meets the edge without the intermediary of a rim. They remained available for purchase from the Mint for face value at least until 1912. One sold at auction in January 2011 for $230,000. (Note: equivalent to $329,179 in 2025 adjusted for inflation) A total of 32,000 eagles were struck using the Barber-modified Saint-Gaudens dies, for the most part using ordinary coinage presses. These are known as the "rounded rim" pieces. On November 9, 1907, with the dies made from the low relief Saint-Gaudens models in full production, Frank Leach, the new Mint director, decided to have 31,950 of the rounded rim specimens melted, saving only fifty. According to Leach in his memoirs, these "were given to museums of art and officials and others connected with the work". The surviving rounded rim specimens can be readily distinguished from later 1907 strikes, as they have dots before, between, and after the words "Ten Dollars" on the reverse. One, which had been in the possession of the Leach family for a century, sold in January 2011 for $2,185,000. (Note: equivalent to $3.13 million in 2025 adjusted for inflation)

Mint Director Leach described the pieces in a report to Cortelyou summarizing the redesign project:

The obverse of the eagle bears the feathered head of Liberty which was originally intended for the one cent piece. The President was so pleased with this design that he decided to have it placed on the eagle. The head, the artist stated, was designed in accordance with the suggestions of the President. The reverse bears the standing eagle, and on the edge of the coins there are forty-six stars, one for each State.

== Design ==
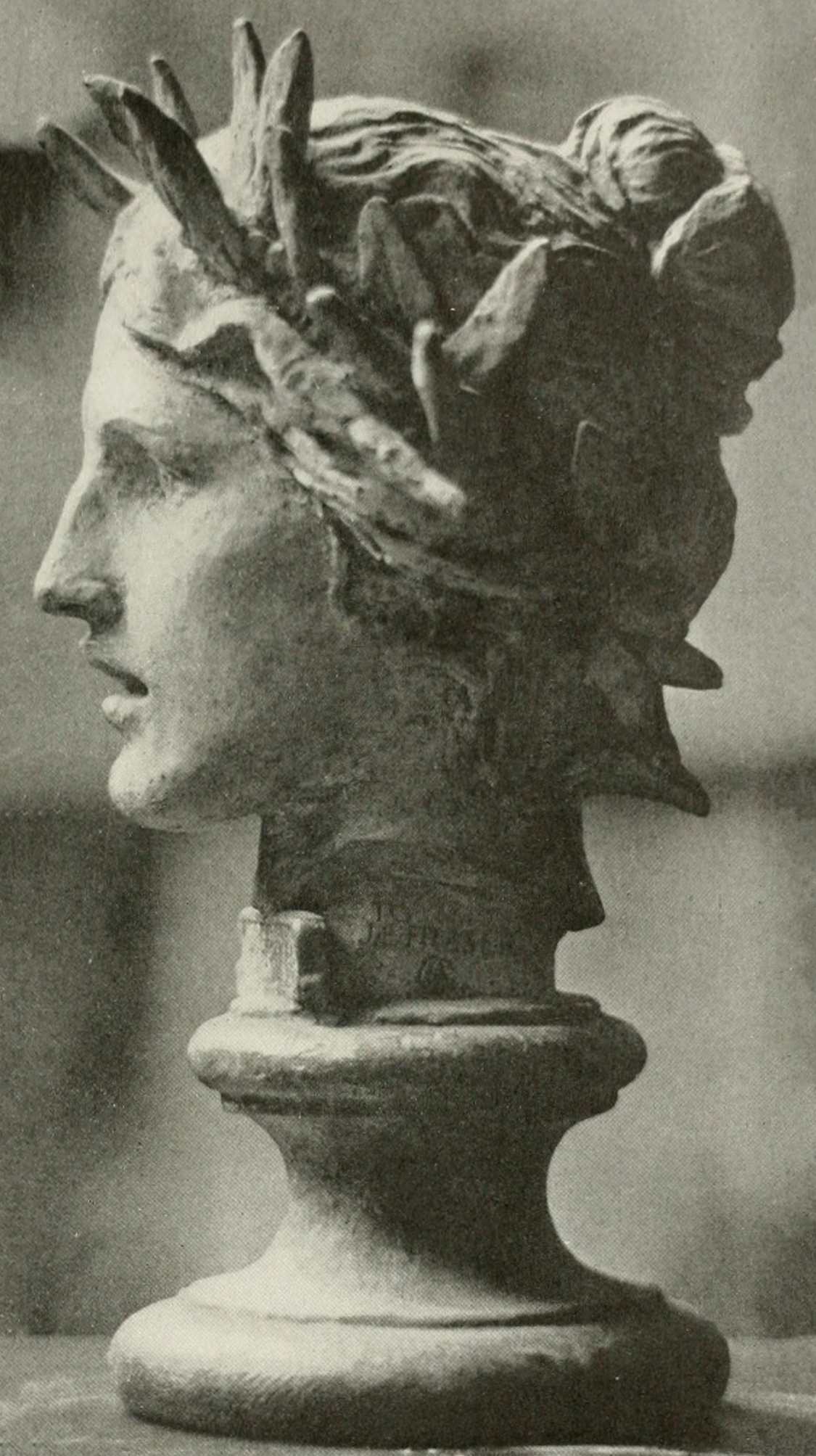
Saint-Gaudens' unused model for the statue of Victory

Saint-Gaudens based his head of Liberty on a model that he had sculpted but not used for the statue of Victory in the William Tecumseh Sherman Monument in New York City, still believing that the design would be considered for the cent. The bust of Harriet Eugenia Anderson also inspired Saint-Gaudens in his model and bas-relief ΝΙΚΗ ΕΙΡΗΝΗ (Greek for victory and peace). His reverse design was an eagle standing on a sheaf of arrows with an olive branch at its feet; this was his original concept for the reverse of the double eagle, and it bears a close similarity to his reverse for the inaugural medal. His ultimate inspiration for the reverse, by one account, was a coin of Ptolemy I of Egypt portraying a standing eagle which was illustrated in a book that he owned and had lent to Roosevelt.

Jeff Garrett and Ron Guth call the details of the coin "a trifle fantastic". They point to the unlikeliness of any female wearing a head-dress only donned by a male warrior, and they describe the word "LIBERTY" on the headdress as "placed incongruously".

== Release and production ==
The new eagles entered circulation around November 4, 1907, although Leach did not receive formal approval to issue the pieces until December 19.

As early as November 7, articles were appearing in newspapers noting the omission of the motto "In God We Trust" on the eagle, and the Mint soon began to receive many complaints. Roosevelt believed that using God's name on coins was sacrilegious, and had confirmed with government lawyers that no law required the motto's use. Saint-Gaudens wanted to include only the minimum of lettering on the new coins, and was content to omit the motto. According to his son Homer, as Saint-Gaudens considered "the motto 'In God We Trust' as an artistic intrusion not required by law, he wholly discarded [it] and thereby drew down on himself the lightning of public comment". The House of Representatives passed a bill ordering the use of the motto on the new eagle and double eagle (which also lacked the phrase) in March 1908; the Senate followed suit in May. Roosevelt, finding public opinion against him, signed the bill into law that month. Barber duly placed the motto on the reverse, to the left of the eagle's breast. On the "No Motto pieces" struck at the Denver Mint in 1908 (catalogued as 1908-D), the mintmark "D" appears above the leaves near the eagle's feet on the reverse; on the pieces with motto struck both at Denver and at San Francisco (mintmark S) beginning in 1908, the mintmark appears to the left of the arrow on which the bird stands. Barber also made other, minor changes in the coin; according to Breen, "Aside from the addition of the motto, none of Barber's niggling changes are defensible as improvements, unless one insists that more of the first U of UNUM had to show. Nor is striking quality increased."

Denver mintmarks from 1908 to 1910 are much larger than those in subsequent years; San Francisco mintmarks are consistently small. With the admission of New Mexico and Arizona as states in 1912, the number of stars on the edge was increased from 46 to 48.

The coin was struck every year from 1907 to 1916. During World War I, with gold coins commanding a premium above face value and many gold pieces returning from Europe to pay for war materials, there was little need for new gold coins; coinage of eagles was discontinued after 1916. Subsequently, Indian Head eagles were struck only in 1920 (at San Francisco), 1926 (at Philadelphia), 1930 (at San Francisco), and final Philadelphia issues in 1932 and 1933. In March 1933, President Franklin Roosevelt ordered that no more gold in the form of coins be released from the Treasury; the Mint subsequently stopped its production of gold coins, ending the eagle series that had begun in 1795.

On December 28, 1933, Acting Secretary of the Treasury Henry Morgenthau ordered Americans to turn in all gold coins and gold certificates, with limited exceptions, receiving paper money in payment. Millions of gold coins were melted down by the Treasury in the following years. Many of the gold coins seen today had been exported to Europe before 1933 and repatriated once restrictions on holding gold were ended.

== Mintage ==
Circulation Mintage for the general circulation versions of the $10 American Indian Eagle Gold coinage is as follows (all 1/2 ounce coins):

Year	Mintage
1907 Rolled Edge, Periods	50
1907 No Periods	239,406
1908 No Motto	33,500
1908-D No Motto	210,000
1908 With Motto	341,370
1908-D With Motto	836,500
1908-S	59,850
1909	184,789
1909-D	121,540
1909-S	292,350
1910	318,500
1910-D	2,356,640
1910-S	811,000
1911	505,500
1911-D	30,100
1911-S	51,000
1912	405,000
1912-S	300,000
1913	442,000
1913-S	66,000
1914	151,000
1914-D	343,500
1914-S	208,000
1915	351,000
1915-S	59,000
1916-S	138,500
1920-S	126,500
1926	1,014,000
1930-S	96,000
1932	4,463,000
1933	312,500

== Collecting ==
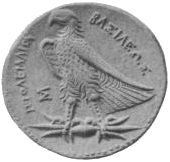
Saint-Gaudens is said to have been given inspiration for his standing eagle design from this illustration of an Ancient Egyptian coin.

With the exception of the 1907 high relief pieces, no date or mintmark of the circulation strikes of the Indian Head eagle before 1920 is particularly rare. The 1911-D, with a mintage of 30,100 commands a significant premium in mint state or uncirculated condition, but only a modest one in circulated grades. Despite its mintage of 126,500, the 1920-S is a major rarity. It was little collected at the time, and with Europe still recovering from the war, few coins were exported there; accordingly, most were melted post-1933. Only a handful of 1933 eagles were distributed before Roosevelt ended the paying out of gold, and virtually the entire mintage of 312,500 was melted. One sold in 2004, graded MS-66 (the finest example of this date known) for $718,750. (Note: equivalent to $1.23 million in 2025 adjusted for inflation) Approximately forty 1933 eagles are known to have survived.

Proof coins were struck from 1907 until 1915, all at Philadelphia. Not all quantities are known, but the highest for which the number struck is known is 1910, with a mintage of 204 (one sold for $80,500 in 2006 (Note: equivalent to $128,563 in 2025 adjusted for inflation)). One of the surviving specimens of the mostly melted rounded rim pieces is in proof; this unique specimen is in private hands. Numismatic expert Mike Fuljenz, in his book on the gold pieces with Indian designs struck in the early 20th century, suggests that this coin was a trial piece, resulting from the test of new dies. Different finishes are known for the proof coins. The unique 1907 piece is in satin proof (the raised designs appear like satin), but later proof eagles were struck in a dark matte finish. Some 1908–1910 proof eagles were struck in a lighter "Roman finish".
