= Eagle (United States coin) =

Gold $10 coin of the United States

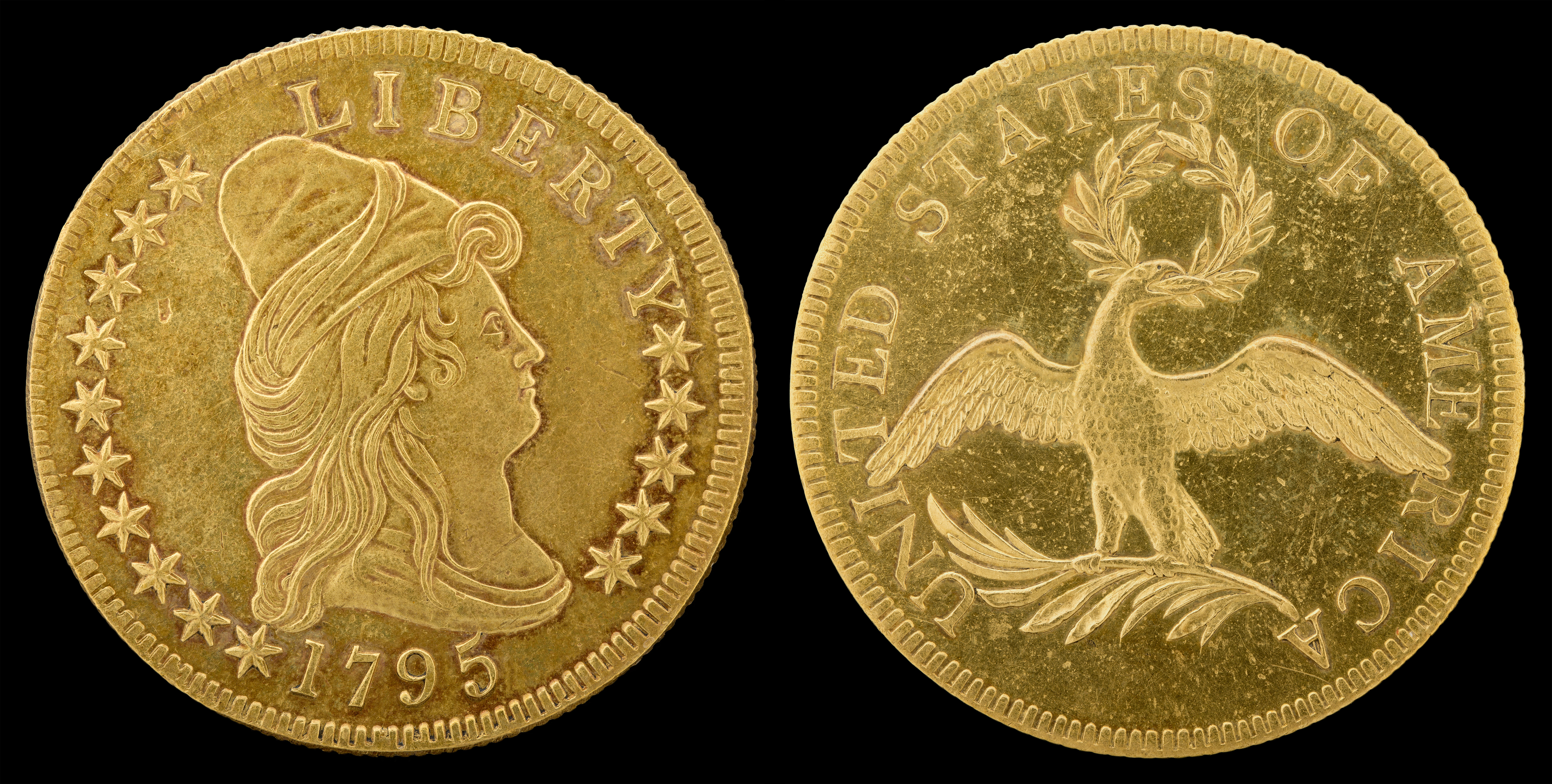
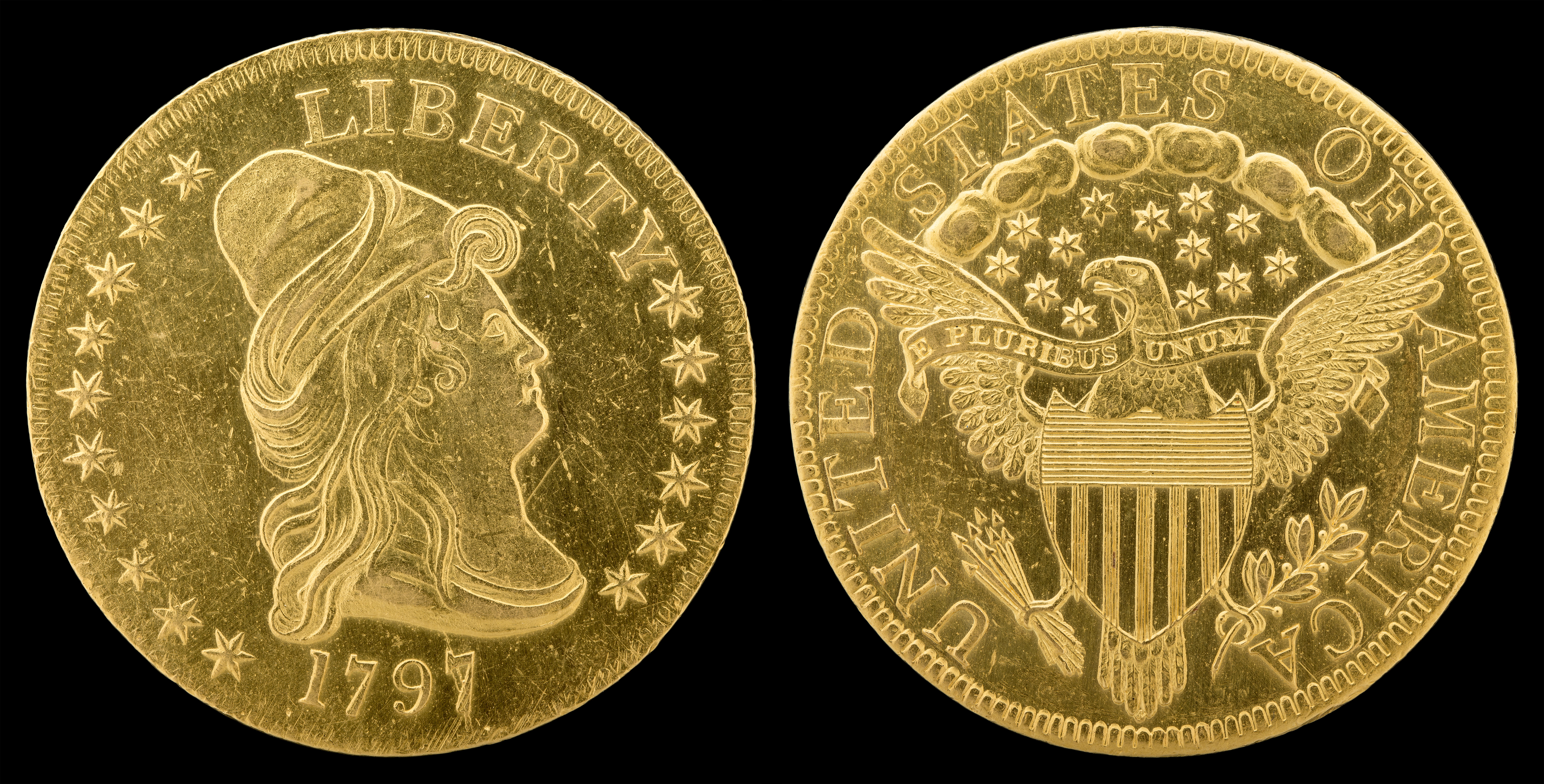
First two design types of the eagle coin with Turban Head obverse (Liberty's hair wrapped around a Phrygian cap) and both small eagle (top) and heraldic eagle (bottom) reverses

The eagle is a United States $10 gold coin issued by the United States Mint from 1795 to 1933.

The eagle was the largest of the five main decimal base-units of denomination used for circulating coinage in the United States prior to 1933, the year when gold was withdrawn from circulation. These five main base-units of denomination were the mill, the cent, the dime, the dollar, and the eagle, where a cent is 10 mills, a dime is 10 cents, a dollar is 10 dimes, and an eagle is 10 dollars. The eagle base-unit of denomination served as the basis of the quarter eagle ($2.50), half eagle ($5), eagle ($10), and double eagle ($20) coins.

With the exceptions of the gold dollar coin, the gold three-dollar coin, the three-cent nickel, and the five-cent nickel, the unit of denomination of coinage prior to 1933 was conceptually linked to the precious or semi-precious metal that constituted a majority of the alloy used in that coin. In this regard the United States followed long-standing European practice of different base-unit denominations for different precious and semi-precious metals. In the United States, the cent was the base-unit of denomination in copper. The dime and dollar were the base-units of denomination in silver. The eagle was the base-unit of denomination in gold although, unlike cent, dime (or disme), and dollar, gold coins never specified their denomination in units of eagles. Thus, a double eagle showed its value as twenty dollars rather than two eagles.

The United States' circulating eagle denomination from the late 18th century through to the first third of the 20th century should not be confused with the American Eagle bullion coins which are manufactured from silver or gold (since 1986), platinum (since 1997), or palladium (since 2017).

== Years of production, and composition ==
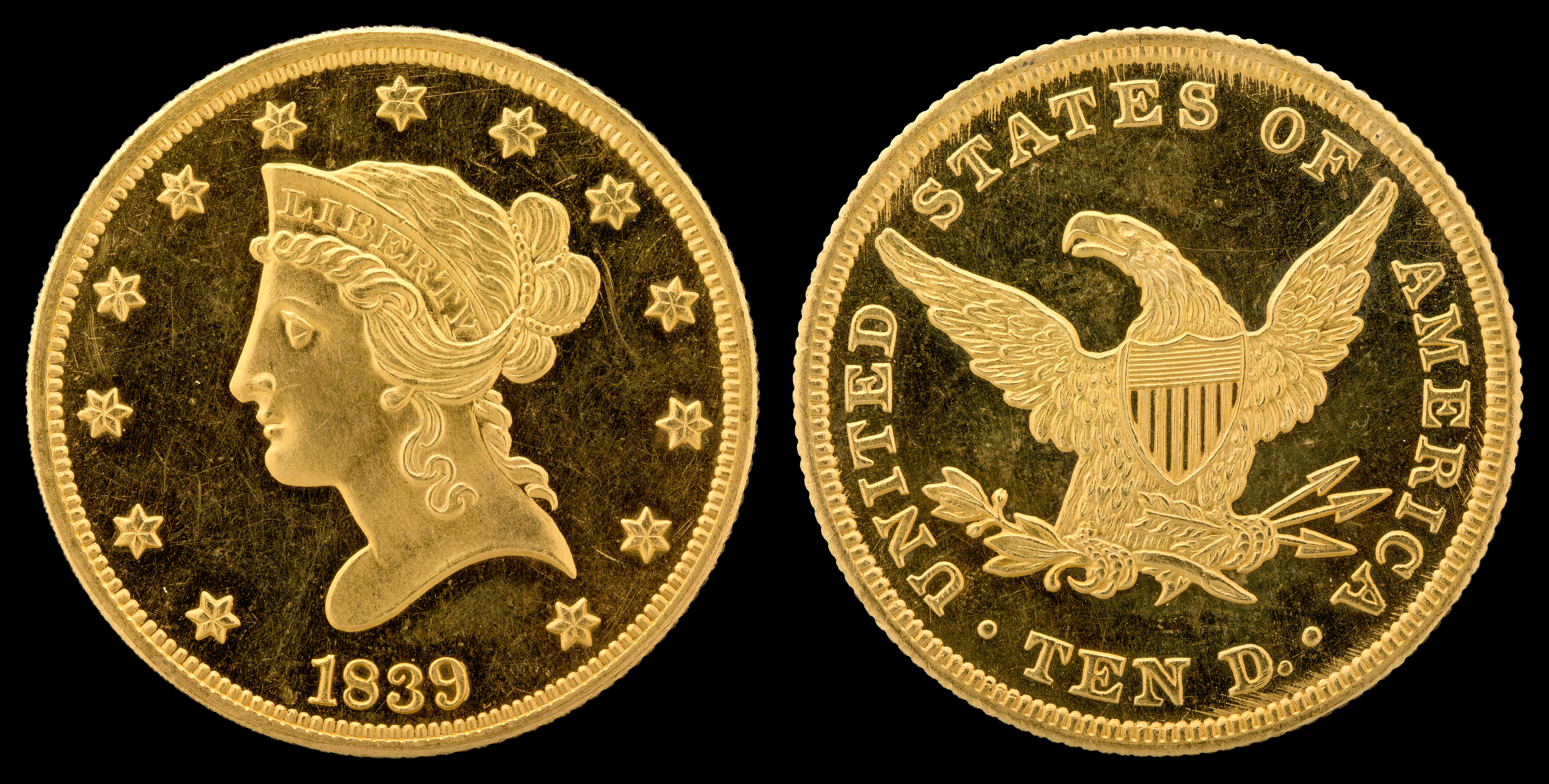
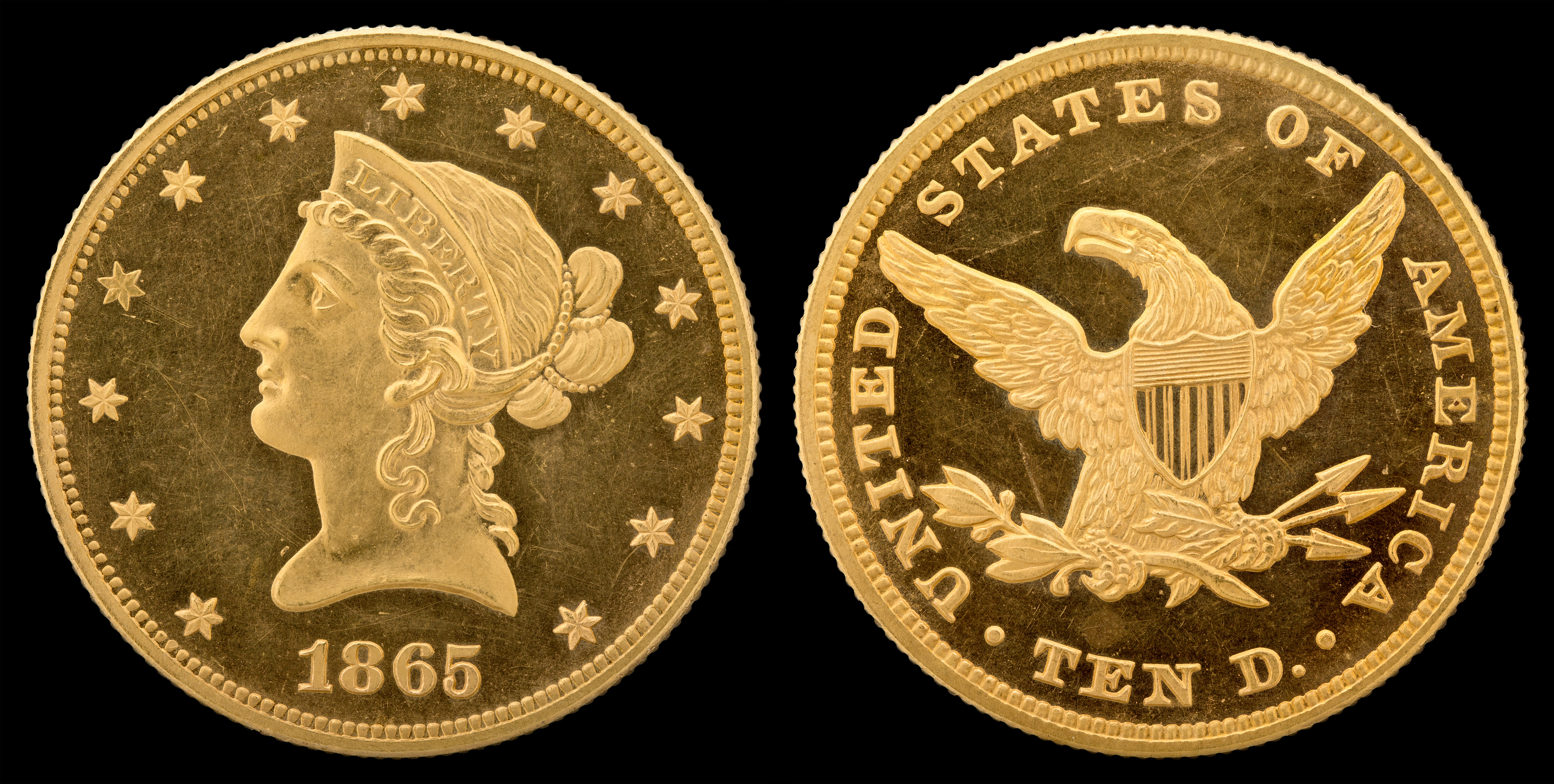
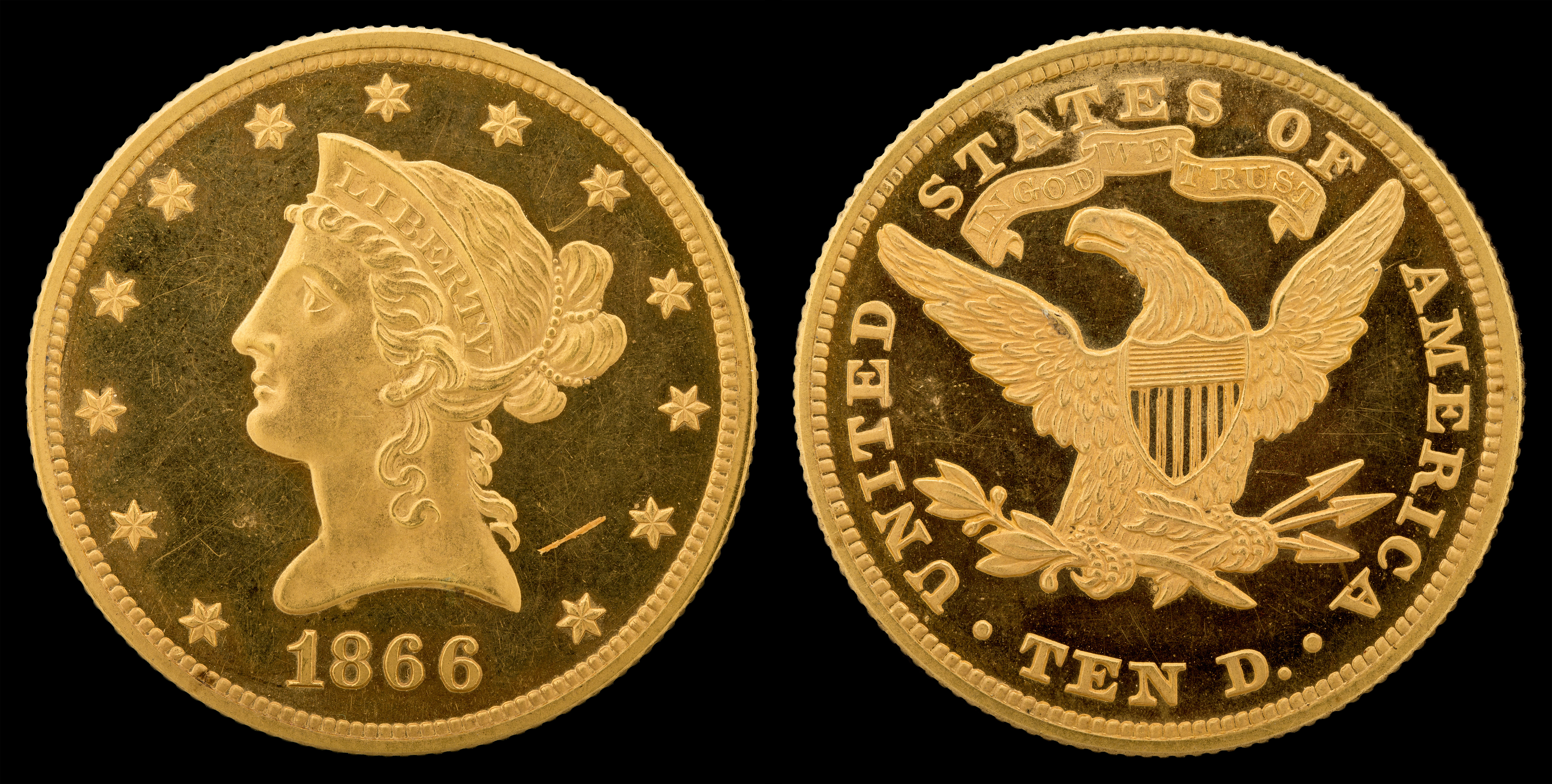
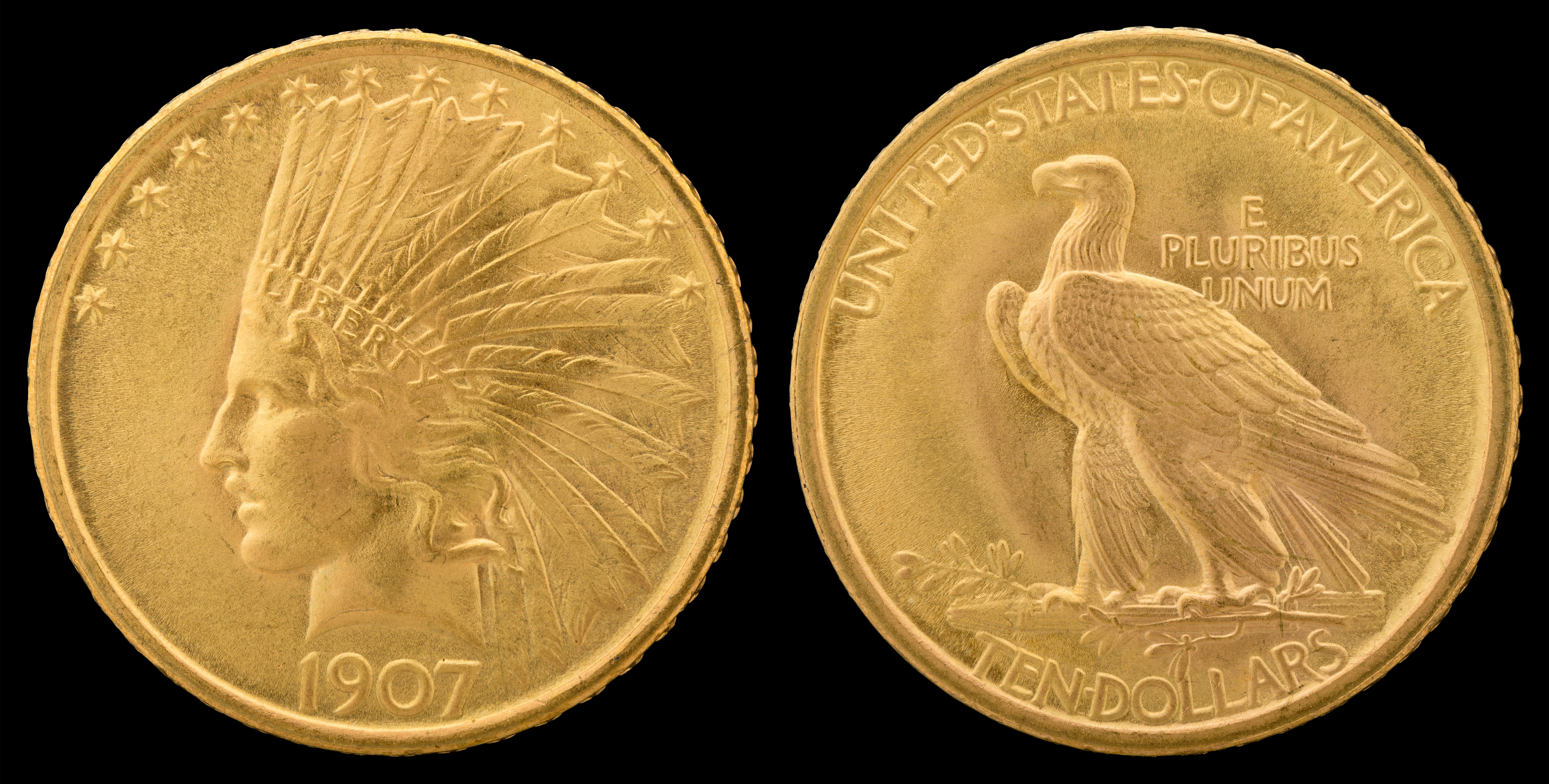
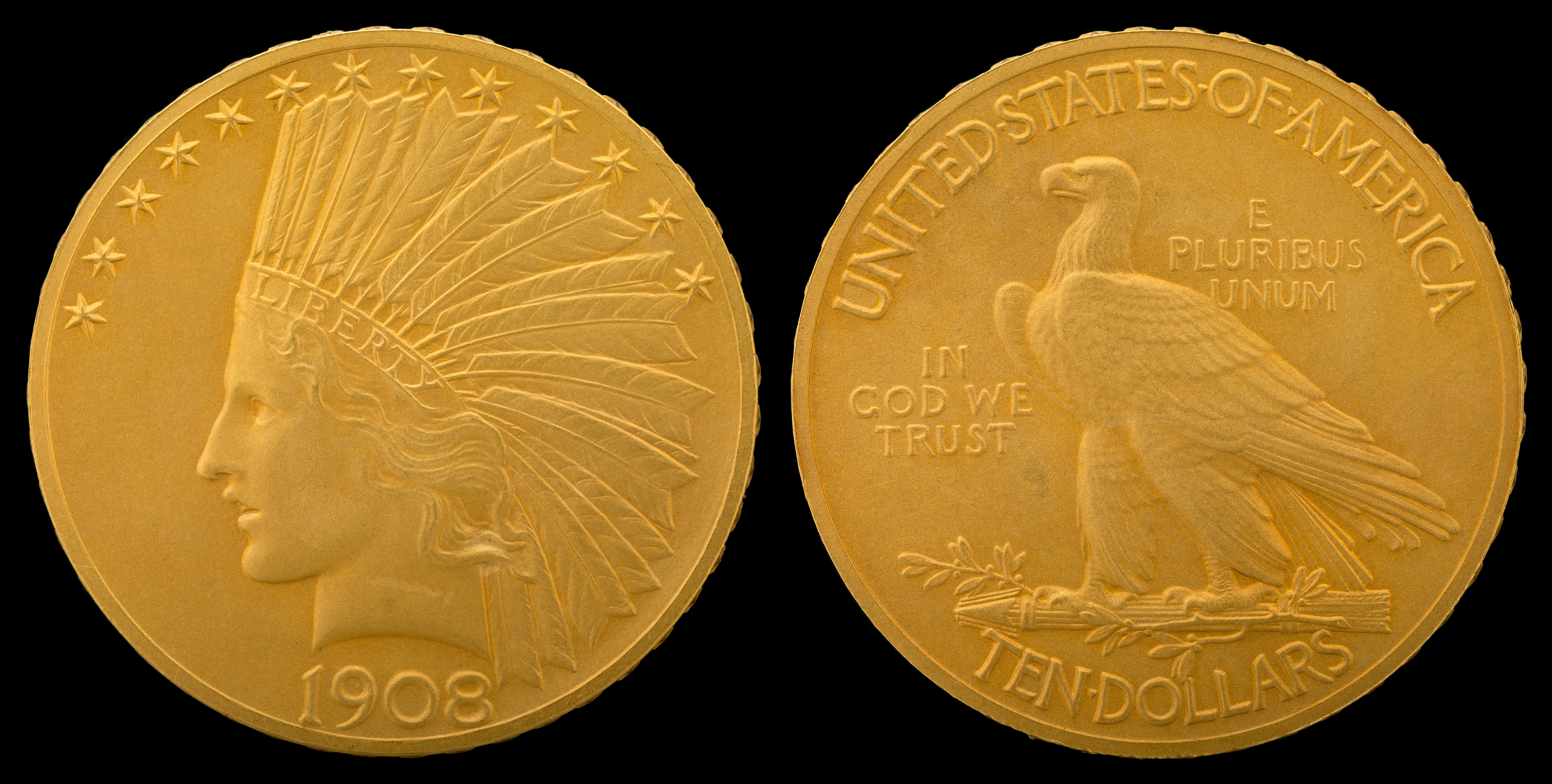
Each of the five remaining design types: (1) 1839 Liberty Head (old), (2) 1865 Liberty Head (new), (3) 1866 Liberty Head (new, motto), (4) 1907 Indian Head (no motto), and (5) 1908 Indian Head (motto)

Gold eagles were issued for circulation by the United States Mint from 1795–1933, half eagles from 1795–1929, quarter eagles from 1796–1929, and double eagles from 1850–1933, with occasional production gaps for each type. Except for the double eagle, the diameters of all these denominations were decreased over time. The following table presents the diameters of each of the denominations, in millimeters (mm), according to the first year that diameter was used:

Year	Quarter Eagle	Half Eagle	Eagle	Double Eagle
1795	—N/a	25.0 mm	33.0 mm	—N/a
1796	20.0 mm	—N/a	—N/a	—N/a
1821	18.5 mm	—N/a	—N/a	—N/a
1829	18.2 mm	23.8 mm	—N/a	—N/a
1834	—N/a	22.5 mm	—N/a	—N/a
1838	—N/a	—N/a	27.0 mm	—N/a
1840	18.0 mm	21.6 mm	—N/a	—N/a
1849	—N/a	—N/a	—N/a	34.0 mm

=== 22 karat "standard" gold ===
Originally the purity of all circulating gold coins in the United States was eleven twelfths pure gold (the same 22 karats level as English crown gold) and one twelfth alloy. Under U.S. law (Coinage Act of 1792), the alloy was composed only of silver and copper, with silver limited to no more than half of the alloy by weight. Thus, U.S. gold coins had 22/24 (22 kt or 91.667%) pure gold, at most 1/24 (0–4.167%) silver, with the remaining fraction, (4.167–8.333%), copper.

The weight of circulating, standard gold, $10 eagles was set at 270 grains (17 g), half eagles at 135 grains (8.7 g), quarter eagles at 67.5 grains (4.37 g). This resulted in the $10 eagle containing 0.5156 troy ounces (16.04 g) of pure gold.

=== Gold content lowered to 89.92% (1834) ===
In 1834, the mint's 15:1 legal valuation of gold to silver (i.e. 15 weight units of silver and 1 weight unit of gold have the same legal monetary value) was changed to 16:1, and the metal weight-content standards for both gold and silver coins were changed, because at the old value ratio and weight content, it was profitable to export and melt U.S gold coins. As a result, the specification for standard gold was lowered from 22 karat (.9167 fine) to .8992 fine (21.58 kt).

=== Gold content raised to 90.0% (1837) ===
With the Coinage Act of 1837, passed on January 18, 1837, a small change in the fineness of the gold (increased to exactly .900 fine) was made, and the alloy (now 10% of the coin's weight) was again legally defined as silver and copper, with silver capped at no more than half. (i.e. 5% of total coin weight) The new standard for the $10 eagle was 258 grains (16.7 g) of .900 fine gold, giving pure gold content of 0.48375 troy ounces (15.046 g), with other coins proportionately sized.

Between 1838 and 1840, the silver content was reduced to zero—the eagle in 1838, half eagle in 1839, and quarter eagle in 1840, — resulting in U.S. gold coins being 90% gold and 10% copper. Using only copper as the alloy in gold coins matched longstanding English practice (see crown gold). The new standard would be used for all circulating gold coins until gold circulation in the US was made illegal by Executive Order 6102 in 1933.

=== Post-1982 eagle modern commemorative coins ===
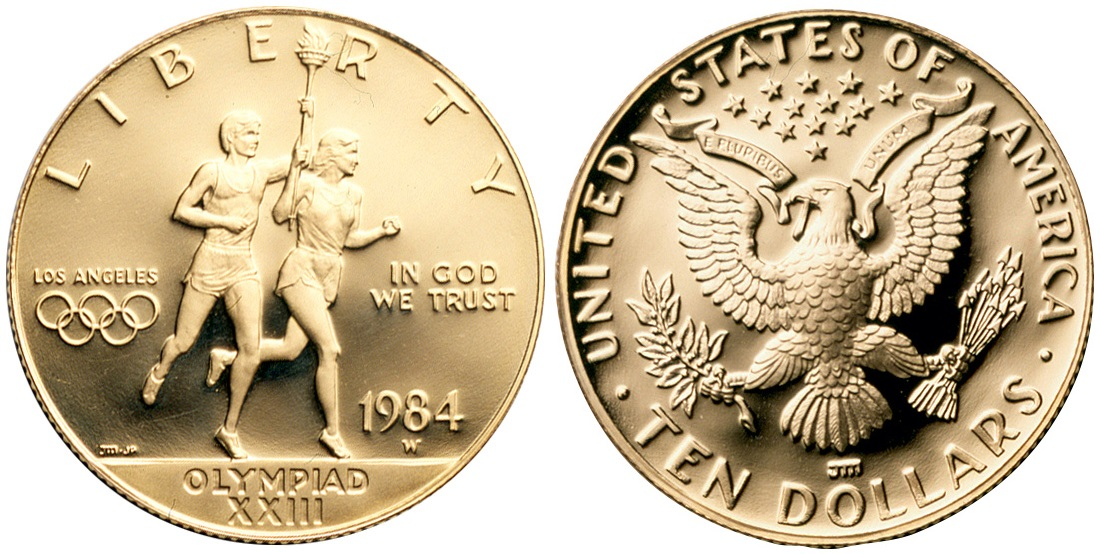
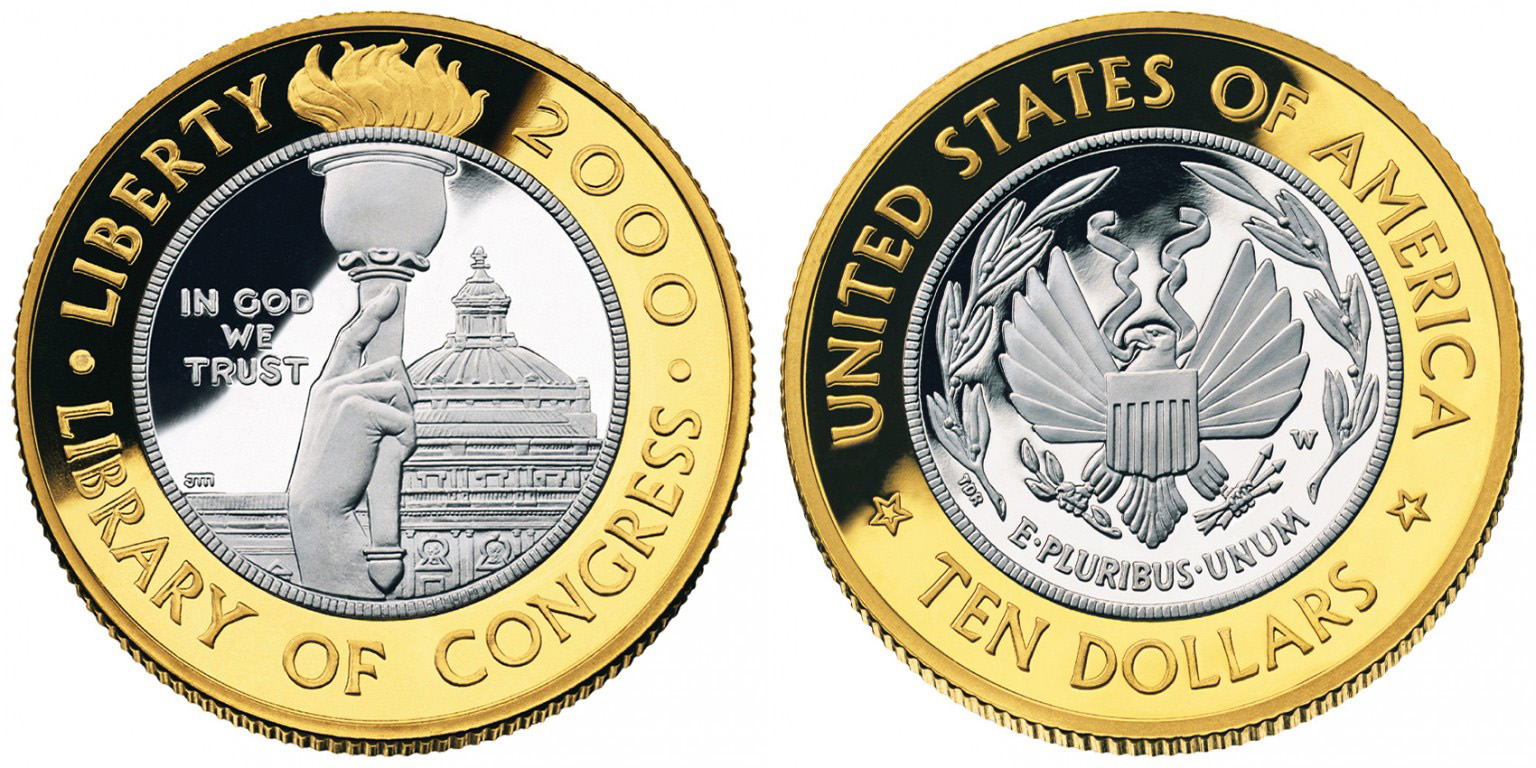
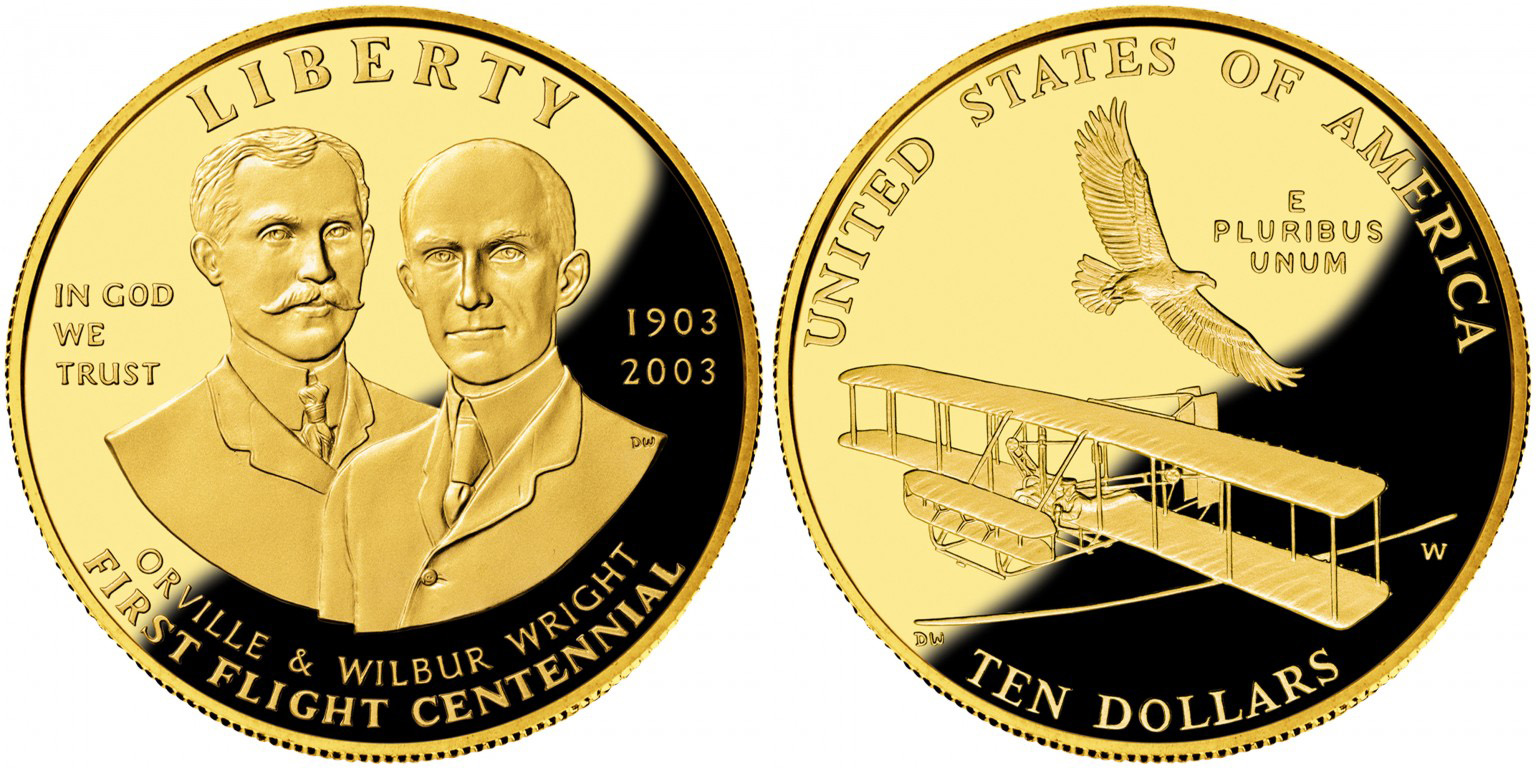
The three $10 commemorative coins: (1) 1984 Summer Olympics, (2) 2000 Library of Congress, and (3) 2003 First Flight Centennial

As part of its Modern United States commemorative coins program the United States mint has issued several commemorative eagle coins. In 1984, an eagle was issued to commemorate the Summer Olympics, and another eagle was issued in 2003 to commemorate the Wright brothers first flight at Kitty Hawk. The pre-1933 .900 fine gold standard was restored; this would also be used in half-eagle gold commemoratives as well. The coins would be identical in fineness and size to their pre-1933 counterparts of the same face value. In 2000 a unique eagle, the Library of Congress bimetallic eagle, was issued commemorating the Library of Congress; it consisted of equal weights of an approximately 1/4 troy ounce (0.27 oz; 7.8 g) .9995 fine platinum core and a .900 fine gold outer ring.

== List of designs ==
- Turban Head 1795–1804
  - Turban Head, small eagle 1795–1797
  - Turban Head, large eagle 1797–1804
- Liberty Head (Coronet) 1838–1907
  - Coronet, without motto 1838–1866
  - Coronet, with motto 1866–1907
- Indian Head 1907–1933

== See also ==
- American Gold Eagle
- American Buffalo
- American Silver Eagle
- American Platinum Eagle
- American Palladium Eagle
- Double eagle
- Half eagle
- Inflation hedge
- Quarter eagle
- The English eagle, a 13th-century coin outlawed under Edward I

== External links and references ==
- US Gold Eagle by year and type – histories, photos, and more.
- American Eagle production numbers
