= George E. Roberts =

- Born: August 19, 1857; Colesburg, Iowa, U.S.
- Died: June 6, 1948 (aged 90); Larchmont, New York, U.S.

George Evan Roberts (August 19, 1857 – June 6, 1948) was Director of the United States Mint from 1898 to 1907, and again from 1910 to 1914.

== Early life and education ==
George E. Roberts was born in Colesburg, Iowa, on August 19, 1857, the son of David and Mary (Harvey) Roberts. He was raised in three areas of Iowa, Dubuque County, Manchester, and Fort Dodge.

== Career ==
=== Newspaper industry ===
Roberts began a career in the newspaper industry by working as a printer's apprentice at the Fort Dodge Times, and later the Fort Dodge Messenger. He served briefly as city editor of the Sioux City Journal. In 1878, he purchased the Fort Dodge Messenger and served as its editor. Roberts was active in the Republican Party of Iowa and, in 1883, was elected State Printer of Iowa, an office he held until 1889. In 1902, he and a partner purchased the Iowa State Register and the Des Moines Leader, which they merged to form the Des Moines Register and Leader.

=== Author and journalist ===
As a newspaper editor, Roberts was particularly interested in economic and monetary policy. He was an opponent of free silver. In 1894, he published a response to William Hope Harvey's Coin's Financial School (1893), entitled Coin at School in Finance. He followed this up with Money, Wages and Prices (1895) and Iowa and the Silver Question (1896). Both of these works were important parts of the campaign that defeated William Jennings Bryan in the 1896 U.S. presidential election. In 1902, Roberts authored the Iowa Republican Party's platform on tariffs, which criticized protectionism and supported reciprocity.

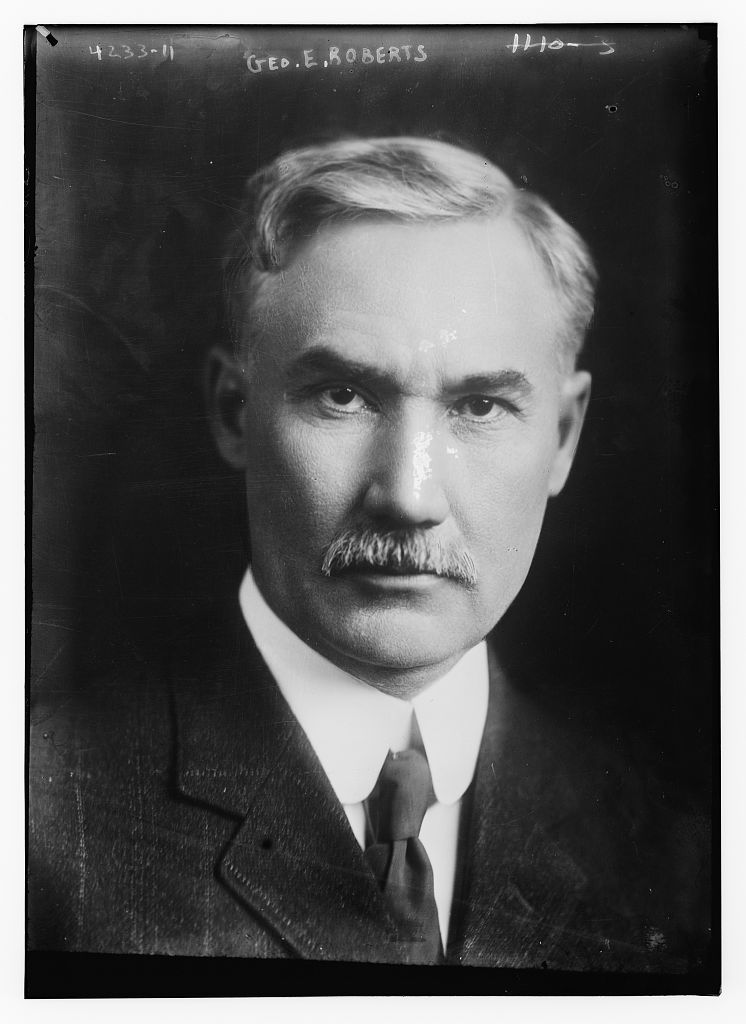
Roberts in 1917

=== United States Mint director ===
Roberts in 1913 while Director of the Mint

In 1898, U.S. Secretary of the Treasury Lyman J. Gage recommended to U.S. president William McKinley that he appoint Roberts Director of the United States Mint, and Roberts held that office for nearly a decade, February 1898 to July 1907. He then became president of the Commercial National Bank in Chicago. In 1910, President William Howard Taft appointed Roberts to a third term as Director of the U.S. Mint, with Roberts holding office from July 1910 to November 1914.

In 1914, he left government service to become assistant to the president of the National City Bank in New York City. In 1916, he was elected as a Fellow of the American Statistical Association. He became a vice president of the bank in 1919, a position he held until 1931, when he became one of the bank's economic advisers, a position he held until his death.

From 1914 to 1940, Roberts edited the bank's monthly economic letter, an investment bulletin dealing with world events, economic affairs, and national and international finances. In 1929, he headed a delegation of financiers to Panama to study that country's finances. He was a member of the Gold Delegation of the Financial Committee of the League of Nations from 1930 to 1932.

== Death ==
Roberts died at his home in Larchmont, New York, on June 6, 1948.

Government offices
Preceded by Robert E. Preston	Director of the United States Mint; February 1898 – July 1907	Succeeded by Frank A. Leach
Preceded by Abram Andrew	Director of the United States Mint; July 1910 – November 1914	Succeeded by Robert W. Woolley
