= Frank A. Leach =

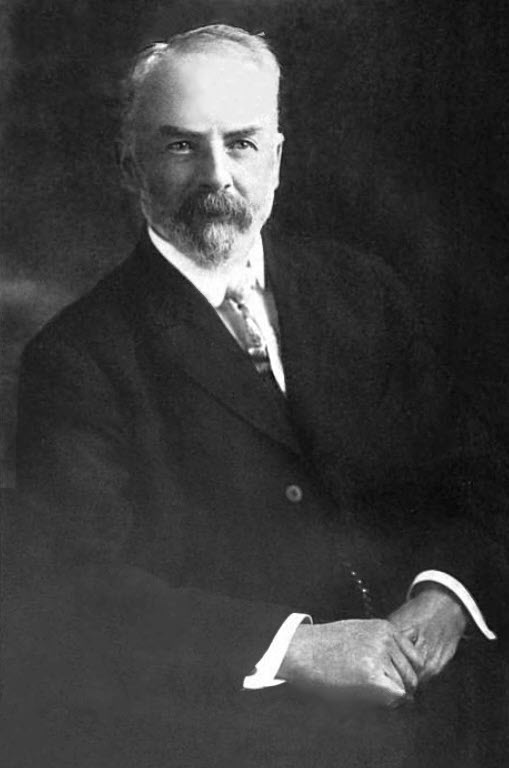
- Frank A. Leach

Director of the United States Mint
- In office September 1907 – August 1909
- President: Theodore Roosevelt; William Howard Taft
- Preceded by: George E. Roberts
- Succeeded by: Abram Andrew

Frank Aleamon Leach (August 19, 1846 – June 19, 1929) was an American newspaperman who was Director of the United States Mint from 1906 to 1909. In the aftermath of the 1906 San Francisco earthquake, the heroic efforts by Frank A. Leach and his men preserved the old San Francisco Mint building and the bullion that then backed the nation's currency.

== Biography ==
Frank A. Leach was born in Auburn, New York, on August 19, 1846, the son of Edwin Warren Leach and his wife Mary A. Leach. When he was a boy, his father moved to Sacramento, California, to establish a bottling plant there, and Frank and his mother later joined his father there. In 1857, the family moved to Napa, California.

In 1867, at age 20, Leach became a newspaper publisher when he began publishing the Vallejo Evening-Chronicle. He married Mary Louise Powell in Vallejo in December 1870. He published the Evening-Standard until 1886, when he moved to Oakland, California, and founded the Oakland Enquirer.

Leach retired from journalism in 1897 to become Superintendent of the San Francisco Mint. In 1907, on the recommendation of United States Secretary of the Treasury George B. Cortelyou, President of the United States Theodore Roosevelt named Leach Director of the United States Mint and Leach held that office from September 1907 until August 1909.

Frank Leach died on June 19, 1929. He is buried at Mountain View Cemetery (Oakland, California), plot 14B.

== Works ==
- Recollections of a Newspaperman. San Francisco, CA: S. Levinson. 1917. p. 416. OCLC 5168858. "Frank Aleamon Leach."
- Wild Life in California: Some of Its Birds, Animals and Flowers. Oakland, CA: Tribune Publishing Company. 1920. p. 109. OCLC 12257730.

Government offices
Preceded by George E. Roberts	Director of the United States Mint; September 1907 – August 1909	Succeeded by Abram Andrew
