= Henry Hardie =

Henry Hardie may refer to:

- Henry Hardie, see North Carolina 1861 5 cents banknote
- Henry P. Hardie, see List of mayors of Anderson, Indiana
- Henry G. Hardie, see Sailing at the 1948 Summer Olympics – 6 metre class

== See also ==
- Henry Hardy (disambiguation)
