= Nickel (United States coin) =

Denomination of United States currency

- United States
- Value: 0.05 U.S. dollar
- Mass: 5.000 g
- Diameter: 21.21 mm (0.835 in) except Shield nickels (1866–1883) 20.5 mm (0.807 in)
- Thickness: Not specified for Shield nickels. All others: 1.95 mm
- Edge: smooth
- Composition: Before 1942 and after 1945: cupro-nickel (75% Cu, 25% Ni); "War nickels" (mid-1942 to 1945):(56% Cu, 35% Ag, 9% Mn)
- Silver: 1942 to 1945 Wartime Nickels only (with large mint mark on reverse) 1.750 g 0.05626 troy oz
- Years of minting: 1866–present (except 1922, 1932, and 1933)

Obverse
- Design: Thomas Jefferson
- Designer: Jamie Franki
- Design date: 2006; 20 years ago

Reverse
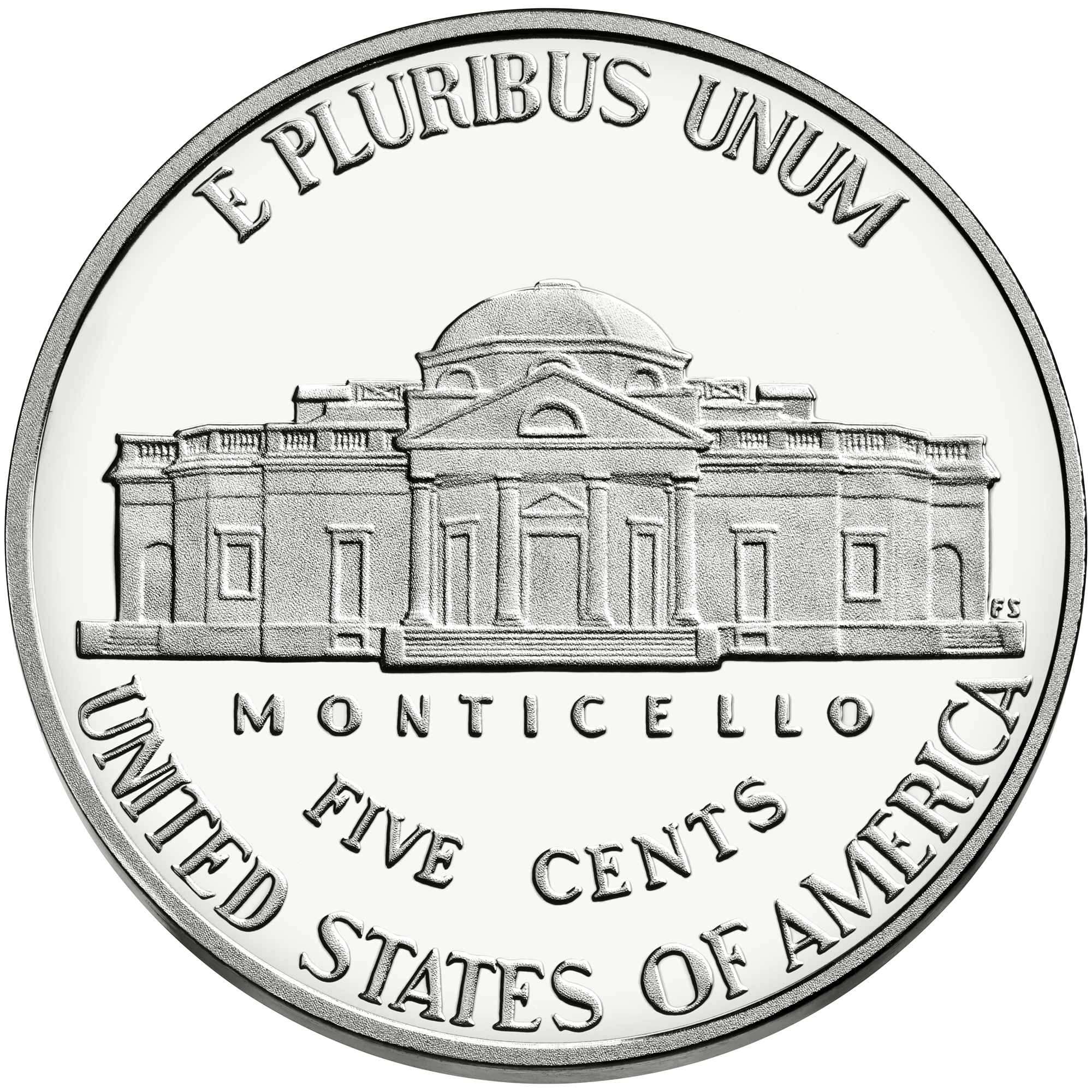
- Design: Monticello
- Designer: Felix Schlag
- Design date: 1938 (not used in 2004 or 2005). Coins before 2006 do not have "FS" on reverse to right of Monticello.

A nickel is a five-cent coin minted by the United States Mint worth 1/20 of a dollar ($0.05). Currently composed of cupronickel (75% copper and 25% nickel), the piece has been issued since 1866. Its diameter is 0.835 inches (21.21 mm) and its thickness is 0.077 inches (1.95 mm). It is the second-lowest face-value physical unit of U.S. currency, after the penny. (Note: Since the halt to penny production for circulation in 2025, the nickel has been the lowest face-value physical unit of U.S. currency produced for circulation.)

The silver half dime, equal to five cents, was issued from 1792 to 1873 before today's cupronickel version. The American Civil War caused economic hardship, driving gold and silver from circulation; in response, the government at first issued paper currency in place of low-value coins. In 1865, Congress abolished the five-cent fractional currency note after Spencer M. Clark, head of the Currency Bureau (today the Bureau of Engraving and Printing), placed his own portrait on the denomination. After the successful introduction of two-cent and three-cent pieces without precious metal, Congress also authorized a five-cent piece consisting of base metal; the Mint began striking this version in 1866. The initial design of the Shield nickel was struck from 1866 until 1883, then was replaced by the Liberty Head nickel. The Buffalo nickel was introduced in 1913 as part of a drive to increase the beauty of American coinage.

The nickel is minted in its modern form as the modification of the Jefferson nickel, which was first introduced in 1938. In 2004 and 2005, special Jefferson nickel designs in honor of the bicentennial of the Lewis and Clark Expedition were issued. In 2006, the Mint reverted to using Jefferson nickel designer Felix Schlag's original reverse (or "tails" side), although a new obverse, by Jamie Franki, was substituted.

As of 2024, nickels cost $0.1378 per coin to produce and distribute. The 2024 production of nickels was 112,800,000, resulting in an annual cost to taxpayers of $17.7 million. The current purchasing power of a nickel is also well below that which the last remaining lowest-denomination coin (the penny) held at the time of the half-cent's elimination in 1857. This has led to proposals to eliminate the nickel along with the penny.

== Silver half dime ==
The silver half disme (as the half dime, pronounced the same, was first called) was one of the denominations prescribed by the Mint Act of 1792; its weight and fineness were set by law. The first pieces under federal authority were half dimes, struck in 1792 in the cellar of John Harper, a saw maker; as the first federal mint was still under construction in Philadelphia, this took place locally at Sixth and Cherry Streets. The dies were engraved by Adam Eckfeldt, who a half-century later recalled that the silver for the half dimes was supplied by President George Washington, and that the 1,500 coins struck from the bullion were given to Washington's Secretary of State, Thomas Jefferson, for distribution to important people, both in the US and overseas. By legend, President Washington supplied silverware from his home, Mount Vernon, to provide bullion for the coins. In his annual message to Congress in late 1792, Washington noted the ongoing construction of a mint building and stated: "There has also been a small beginning in the coinage of half dimes, the want of small coins in circulation calling the first attention to them."

In 1793, the newly established Philadelphia Mint began striking cents and half cents. Coinage of precious metal was delayed; Congress required the assayer and chief coiner to each post a security bond of $10,000, a huge sum in 1793. In 1794, Congress lowered the chief coiner's bond to $5,000, and the assayer's to $1,000; President Washington's appointees to those positions were thus able to qualify and take office. Subsequently, silver coinage began that year.

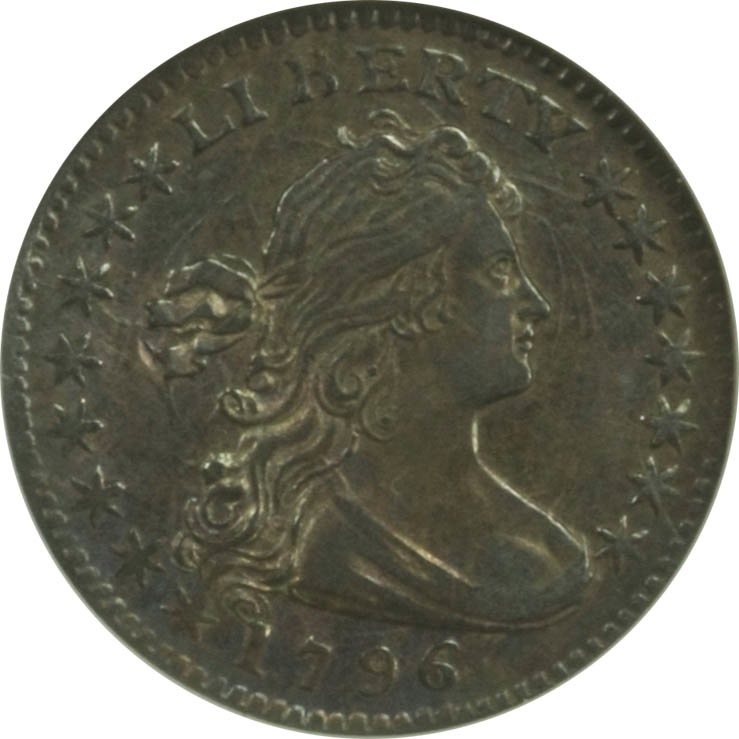
A 1796 half dime

The half dime was originally struck from 1794 until 1805, though none were dated 1798, 1799, or 1804. By 1804, silver US coins were heavily exported, as they could be exchanged at par in the West Indies with heavier Spanish coins, which were then imported as bullion and deposited at the Mint for melting and restriking. In response, in 1804 the US stopped striking silver dollars; issuance of the half dime was discontinued from 1805 until 1829. In 1807, mint Director Robert Patterson in a letter explained to Jefferson (by then president) "nearly the whole of our Silver Bullion (chiefly Spanish dollars) come through the Banks, and it is very seldom that they will consent to take any coin less than half dollars."

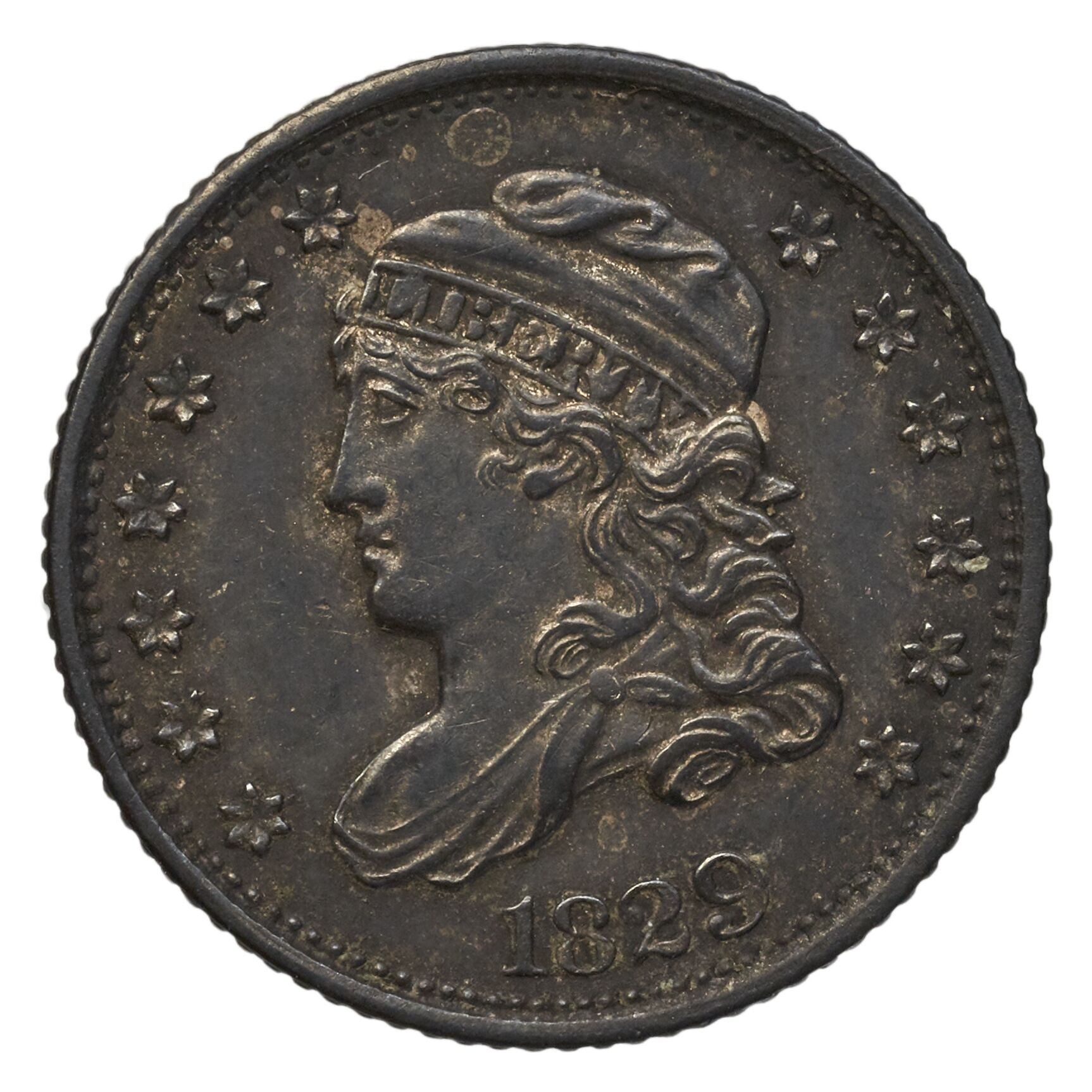
1829 silver five-cent piece

Beginning in 1829, the silver five-cent piece was again struck; beginning in 1837, its fineness was increased from .8924 to .900. Also in 1837, the half dime's obverse design changed from one by William Kneass, depicting a bust of Liberty, to one that featured a seated Liberty by Christian Gobrecht; until its abolition in 1873, the half dime would bear modifications of this design. In 1851, it ceased to be the smallest US silver coin as a three cent piece was issued by the Mint.

== Birth of the nickel ==
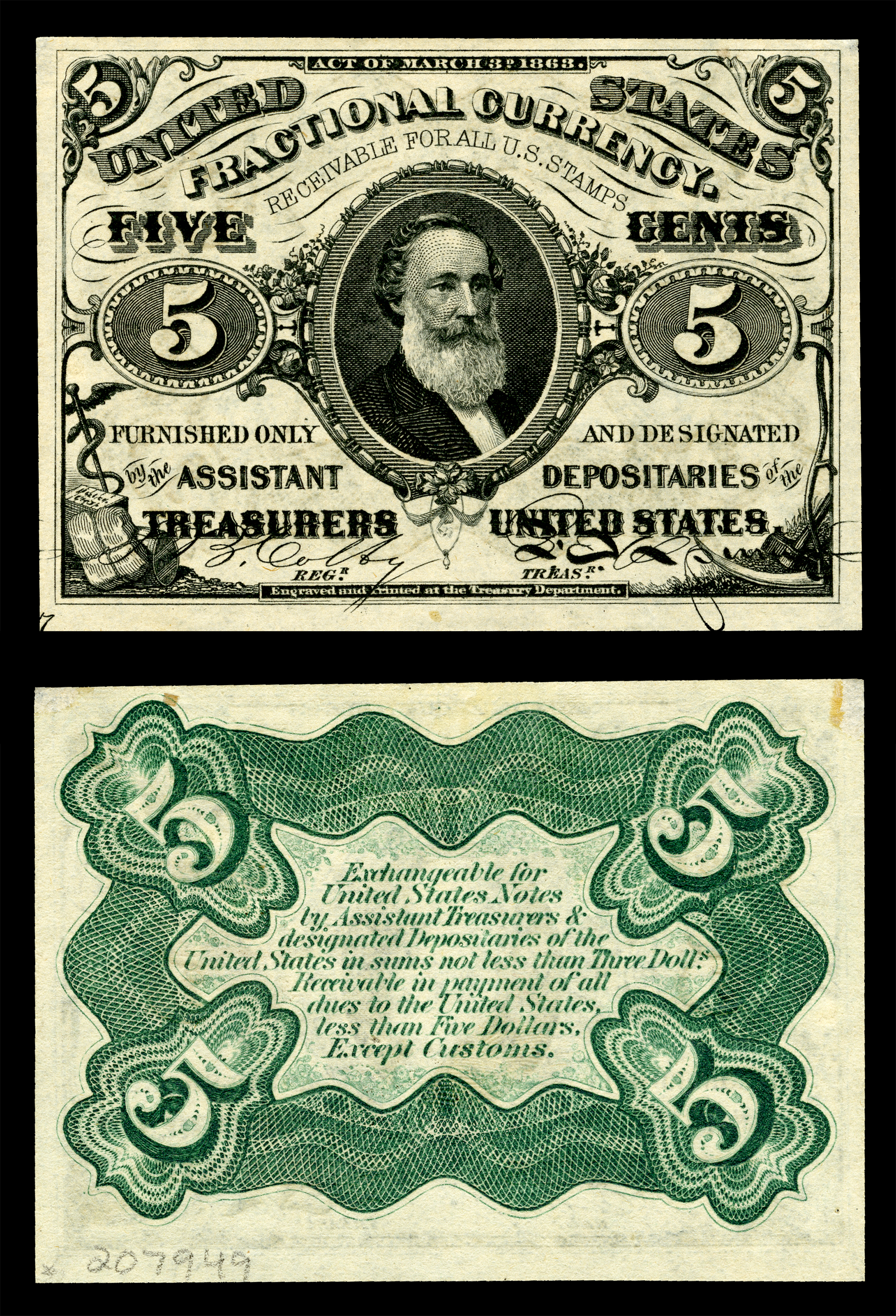
Spencer M. Clark, Supervisor of the Currency Bureau, placed his own likeness on the five-cent U.S. fractional currency note, leading directly to legislation prohibiting the depiction of any living person on U.S. currency.

The Civil War caused most American coins to vanish from circulation, with the gap filled by such means as merchant tokens, encased postage stamps, and United States fractional currency, issued in denominations as low as three cents. Although specie (gold or silver coins) was hoarded or exported, the copper-nickel cent, then the only base metal denomination being struck, also vanished. In 1864, Congress began the process of restoring coins to circulation by abolishing the three-cent note and authorizing bronze cents and two-cent pieces, with low intrinsic values, to be struck. These new coins initially proved popular, though the two-cent piece soon faded from circulation. On March 3, 1865, Congress passed legislation authorizing the Mint to strike three-cent pieces of 75% copper and 25% nickel.

In 1864, Congress authorized a third series of fractional currency notes. The five-cent note was to bear a depiction of "Clark", but Congress was appalled when the issue came out not with a portrait of William Clark, the explorer, but Spencer M. Clark, head of the Currency Bureau. According to numismatic historian Walter Breen, Congress's "immediate infuriated response was to pass a law retiring the five-cent denomination, and another to forbid portrayal of any living person on federal coins or currency." Clark kept his job only because of the personal intervention of Treasury Secretary Salmon P. Chase.

Mint Director James Pollock had been opposed to striking coins containing nickel, but in view of the initial success of the copper-nickel three-cent piece, he became an advocate of striking five-cent pieces in the same metals. In his 1865 report, Pollock wrote, "From this nickel alloy, a coin for the denomination of five cents, and which would be a popular substitute for the five cent note, could easily be made ... [The five-cent coin should be struck in base metal] only until the resumption of specie payments ... in time of peace ... coins of inferior alloy should not be permitted to take the place permanently of silver in the coinage of pieces above the denomination of three cents."

Industrialist Joseph Wharton had a near-monopoly on the mining of nickel in the United States, and sought to promote its use in coinage. He was also highly influential in Congress. His friends there, though they had failed to obtain the metal's use for the two-cent piece, had been more successful with the base-metal three-cent coin. Pollock prepared a bill authorizing a five-cent coin of the same alloy as the three-cent piece, with a total weight not to exceed 60 grains (3.9 g). At the committee stage in the House of Representatives, the weight was amended to 77.19 grains (5.00 g), ostensibly to make the weight equal to five grams in the metric system but more likely so that Wharton could sell more nickel. This made the new coin heavy, in terms of weight per $.01 of face value, compared to the three-cent copper-nickel coin. The bill passed without debate on May 16, 1866. The new copper-nickel coin was legal tender for up to one dollar and would be paid out by the Treasury in exchange for coin of the United States, excluding the half cent, cent and two-cent. It was redeemable in lots of $100 for banknotes. Fractional currency in denominations of less than ten cents was withdrawn.

== Shield nickel (1866–1883) ==
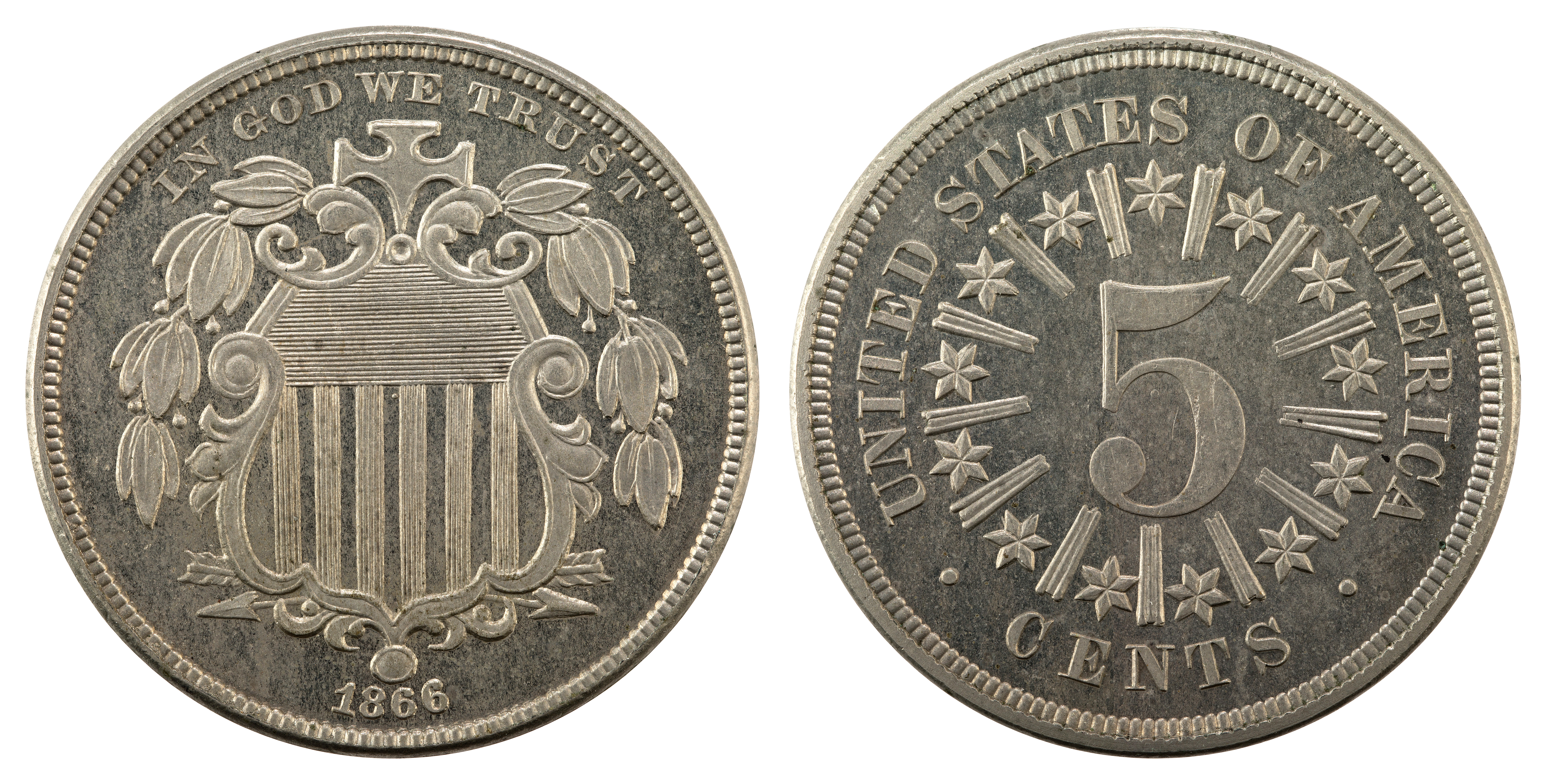
The Shield nickel, as struck with rays

In anticipation of the approval of the new five-cent coin, the Mint's chief engraver, James B. Longacre, had begun preparing designs and pattern coins in 1865. After rejecting pieces showing deceased presidents George Washington (see Washington nickel) and Abraham Lincoln, Treasury Secretary Hugh McCulloch decided on a design similar to Longacre's two-cent piece, with a shield on the obverse and a numeral 5 surrounded by stars and rays on the reverse. This has come to be known as the Shield nickel.

The new coins proved difficult to produce; owing to the hardness of the planchet, the coins were not of high quality and the life of the striking dies was brief. The design was widely criticized; Wharton described the obverse as suggesting "a tombstone surmounted by a cross and overhung by weeping willows." The American Journal of Numismatics described the Shield nickel as "the ugliest of all known coins". The rays were eliminated from the reverse design in 1867, in the hope of eliminating some of the production problems. The design change created confusion among the population—many people assumed that one design or the other was a counterfeit—and the Mint briefly considered abandoning the shield design entirely. After heavy production in its first years, by late 1869, enough nickels had been struck to meet the needs of commerce; fewer were coined in the following years.

The new coins tended to accumulate in the hands of merchants beyond the legal tender limit, but banks refused to accept them beyond the one-dollar maximum. Storeowners were forced to discount the coins to brokers. Postmasters, compelled by law to accept the coins, found that the Treasury would not accept them as deposits except in lots of $100, in accordance with the authorizing statute. In 1871, Congress alleviated the problem by passing legislation allowing the Treasury to redeem unlimited quantities of nickels and other low-denomination coins when presented in lots of not less than $20. It was not until 1933, long after the shield design passed from the scene, that the nickel was made legal tender without limit.

Half dimes continued to be struck, at both the Philadelphia and the San Francisco Mint, until the series was ended by the Coinage Act of 1873. Despite the abolition, the silver pieces continued to circulate in the West, where silver or gold coins were preferred, throughout the remainder of the 19th century. Improved economic conditions, combined with low silver prices, brought large quantities of hoarded silver coinage, including half dimes, into circulation beginning in April 1876. In late 1876, production of the Shield nickel was halted. No Shield nickels were struck in 1877 or 1878, excepting proof specimens for collectors. As the Treasury had a large stock of nickels in storage, only small numbers were struck over the next few years; full-scale production did not resume until December 1881.

== Liberty Head or "V" nickel (1883–1913) ==
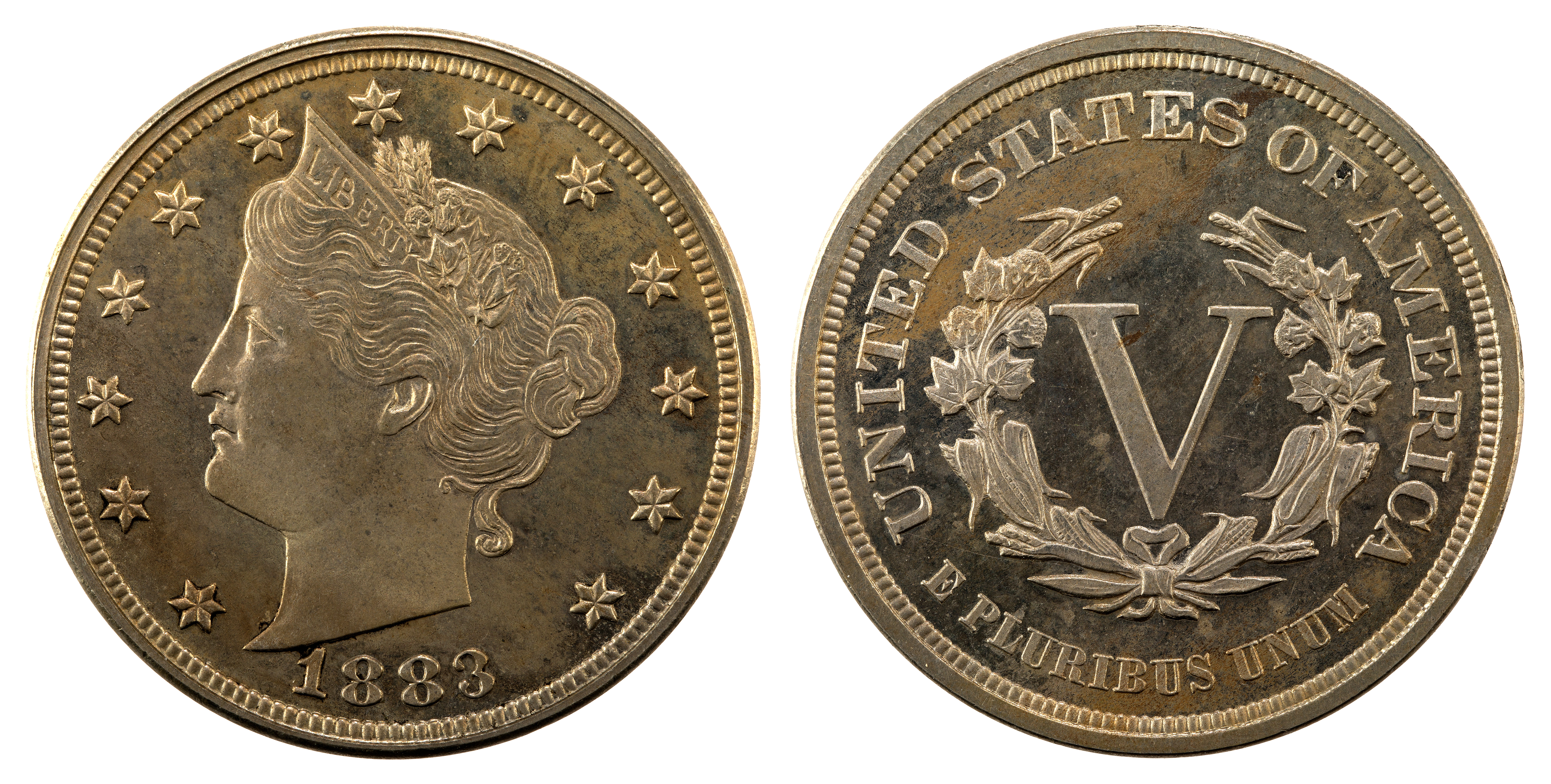
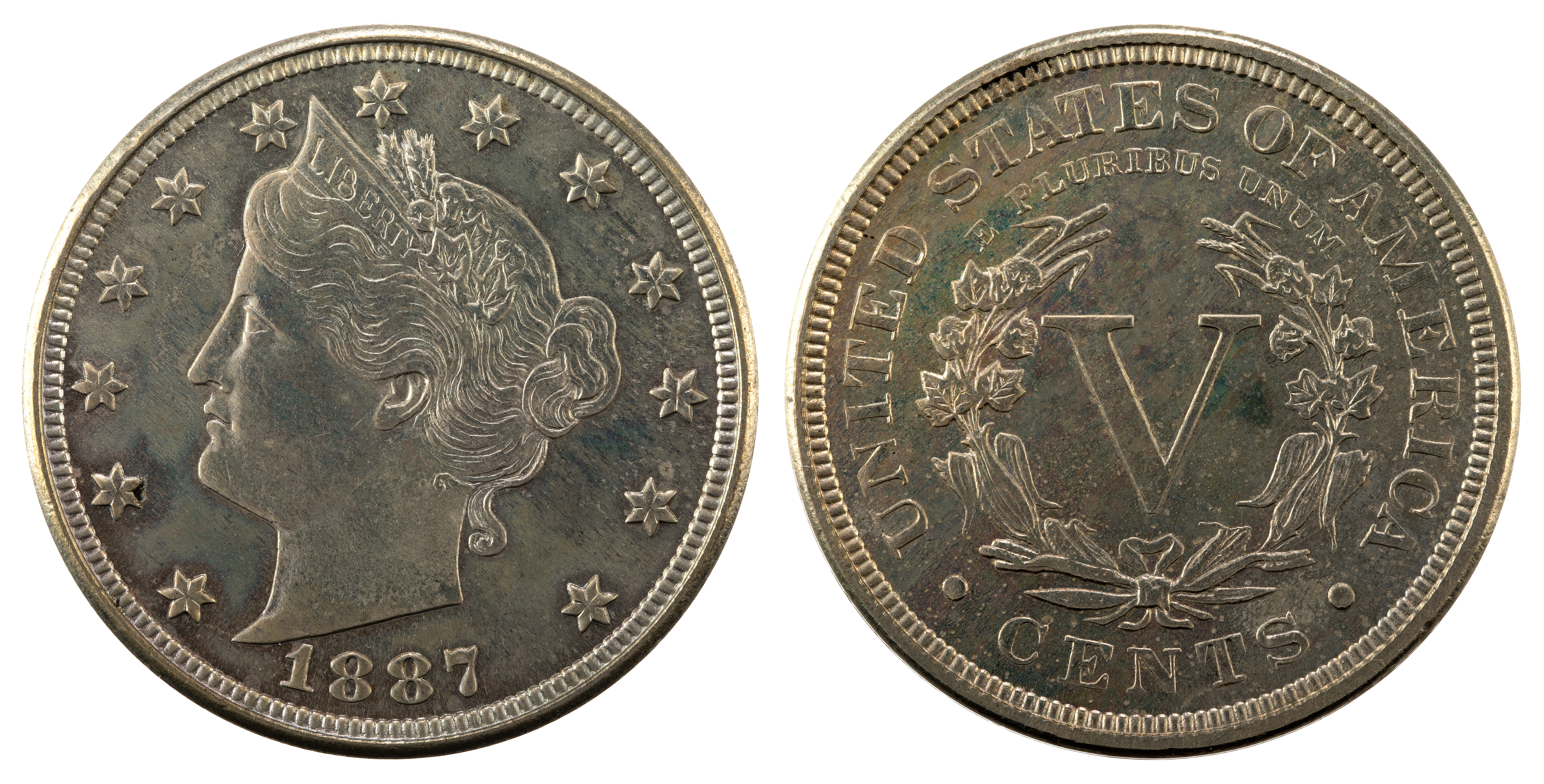
"V" nickel without and with "cents"

With production of nickels lagging in the late 1870s, and with minimal strikings of the copper-nickel three-cent piece, Wharton sought to increase the use of nickel at the Mint. The bronze cent represented a major portion of the Mint's production, and Wharton began to lobby for the piece to be struck in copper-nickel, as it had been from 1857 until 1864. In 1881, this lobbying led Philadelphia Mint Superintendent Archibald Loudon Snowden to order Mint Engraver Charles Barber to produce uniform designs for a new cent, three-cent piece, and five-cent piece. Snowden required that the new coins depict the head of Liberty with the legend LIBERTY and the date, with the nickel's reverse to have a wreath of wheat, cotton, and corn around a Roman numeral "V" for "5", to denote the denomination. Under the proposal, the nickel would retain its weight of 5 grams (0.18 oz), but its diameter would be increased to 22 millimetres (0.87 in).

Barber duly produced the required designs. Snowden eventually decided against a new cent or three-cent piece, but Barber continued work on the nickel, with the size adjusted to 21.21 millimetres (0.835 in). When specimens were sent to Washington for routine approval by Treasury Secretary Charles J. Folger, to Snowden's surprise, they were rejected. The secretary, on review of the coinage statutes, had realized that the laws required "UNITED STATES OF AMERICA" to appear on the reverse, not the obverse where Barber had placed it. Barber modified his design accordingly, and the coin was ready for striking in early 1883. However, by then, Shield nickels dated 1883 had already been coined. To ensure proof Shield pieces would not be hoarded for their rarity, Mint officials allowed their continued production for several months.

Criminals soon realized that the new nickel, which lacked the word "CENTS", was close in size to the five-dollar gold piece, and if they were to plate the nickel with gold, it might be passed for five dollars. Some coins were even given a reeded edge by fraudsters, making them appear more like the gold coins. The Mint halted production of the new coins; production of Shield nickels continued. Barber was told to modify his work, which he did, moving other design elements to accommodate the word "CENTS" at the bottom of the reverse. The revised nickel was issued on June 26, 1883, the date on which production of the Shield nickel was finally stopped. The public promptly hoarded the "centless" nickels, believing the Treasury Department intended to recall them, and that they would become rare.

The Liberty Head nickel was heavily struck during its 30-year run, except during economic downturns in 1885–1886 and in 1894, when only small numbers were struck. In 1890, Congress ended production of the three-cent piece, leaving the five-cent coin as the only one in copper nickel. That year, Congress also allowed the Secretary of the Treasury to authorize the redesign of United States coins, if the former design had been struck for at least 25 years. Although the nickel and silver dollar had been redesigned within the previous quarter-century, a provision in the latter act made them eligible for immediate redesign. In 1896, pattern nickels were struck for the first time since 1885, when experimental, holed coins had been tested; however, no redesign took place.

=== Growth of the nickel in commerce ===
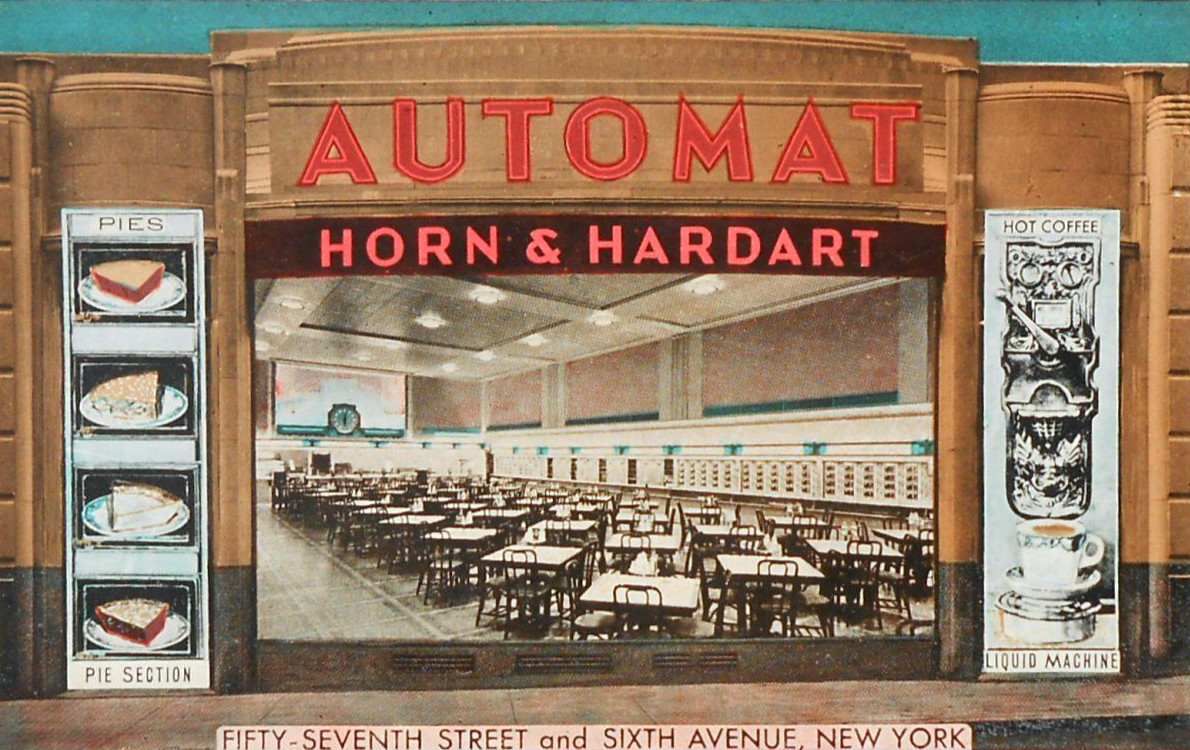
Postcard for Horn & Hardart restaurants, 1930s

By 1893, the half dime had become rare in circulation. Streetcar companies and other industries which dealt in five cent denominations continued to remit bags of the small coins to the Treasury.

Coin-operated machines to vend food, for amusement, and for gambling became popular in the 1890s. Such machines could be placed on otherwise unused floor space in businesses, required little maintenance, and brought in money for owners. Beginning about 1898, coin-operated mechanical pianos also became popular. The Mills Novelty Company was a leading producer of such devices; by 1906 it was producing machines ranging from a mechanically played violin to fortune-telling devices. While some machines took cents or other denominations, the nickel was the coin of choice for these machines.

Among the innovations in business caused by the use of the nickel in coin-operated machines was the automat, in which patrons would serve themselves by inserting a coin (initially a nickel, though by the 1950s a higher denomination was needed) into a mechanism, turning a handle, and removing a sandwich or dessert. These restaurants were first established in Germany, but were popularized in the United States by, among other firms, Horn & Hardart. A type of business which took its name from the coin was the nickelodeon cinema, where a nickel bought admission to view a series of one-reel short films, generally about 12 minutes in length, which ran continuously from early afternoon until late at night, with the patron free to remain as long as he liked. Although another denomination gave the penny arcade its name, the nickel was commonly used there as well.

Few nickels had circulated in the western states before the 1880s (people there preferred silver and gold coins); interest in the new Liberty Head design had led to increasing use of nickels there. Good economic conditions and high demand for nickels for use in coin-operated devices caused the piece to circulate throughout the nation by 1900, as the nickel had the purchasing power of $1.94 today. That year, Mint Director George E. Roberts called on Congress to quintuple the Mint's appropriation to purchase base metals for striking into nickels and cents. At the time, statutory restrictions permitted production of cents and nickels only at Philadelphia; Roberts' request that Congress allow striking at the other mints was granted in 1906. The Denver and San Francisco Mints began striking nickels in 1912.

=== 1913 Liberty Head nickel rarity ===
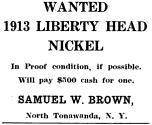
Ad placed by Brown in The Numismatist, December 1919

The Liberty Head nickel was replaced after 1912, and initially there was no indication that 1913-dated pieces with that design existed. In December 1919, a coin dealer, Samuel W. Brown, placed advertisements in coin publications, offering to buy 1913 Liberty Head nickels. The following August, Brown appeared at the annual American Numismatic Association (ANA) convention bearing such a piece. Brown claimed that a master die had been prepared for 1913 and that these pieces had been run off to test it. As it turned out, Brown possessed five coins, which he eventually sold. After spending fifteen years in the hands of the eccentric Col. E.H.R. Green, the famous Fort Worth, Texas, area collector, the coins were finally dispersed in 1943. Since then, they have had several owners each. Today, two are on public display—at the Smithsonian Institution in Washington and the ANA's Money Museum in Colorado Springs, while three are owned privately. The most recent sale of a 1913 Liberty Head nickel was in October 2022, when one sold for $4,200,000 in an auction.

It is uncertain how the 1913 nickels came to be made. The Mint's records show no production of 1913 Liberty head nickels, and none were authorized to be made. Dies were prepared in advance and sent to California for a 1913-S Liberty Head nickel coinage, but upon orders from Mint Director Roberts in December 1912 to end the old design, they were returned to Philadelphia. They were received by December 23, and were almost certainly destroyed routinely by early January. Brown had been an employee at the Philadelphia Mint (although this was not known until 1963) and many theories focus suspicion on him.

== Buffalo or Indian Head (1913–1938) ==
The Buffalo nickel, minted from 1913 to 1938.

In 1904, President Theodore Roosevelt expressed his dissatisfaction with the artistic state of American coins, and hoped to hire sculptor Augustus Saint-Gaudens to beautify them. Saint-Gaudens, before his death in 1907, designed a new eagle and double eagle, which entered circulation that year; the cent, quarter eagle, and half eagle were redesigned by other artists and were released into circulation by 1909. That year, Mint Director Frank Leach instructed Barber to make pattern coins for new nickels. Most of these coins featured the first president, George Washington. However, the project was discontinued when Leach left office on November 1, 1909, to be replaced by Abram Andrew.

On May 4, 1911, Eames MacVeagh, son of Treasury Secretary Franklin MacVeagh wrote to his father:

A little matter that seems to have been overlooked by all of you is the opportunity to beautify the design of the nickel or five cent piece during your administration, and it seems to me that it would be a permanent souvenir of a most attractive sort. As possibly you are aware, it is the only coin the design of which you can change during your administration, as I believe there is a law to the effect that the designs must not be changed oftener than every twenty-five years. I should think also it might be the coin of which the greatest numbers are in circulation.

Soon after the MacVeagh letter, Andrew announced that the Mint would solicit new designs for the nickel. Sculptor James Earle Fraser, who had been an assistant to Saint-Gaudens, approached the Mint and rapidly produced concepts and designs. Mint Director George Roberts, who had returned to office in place of Andrew, initially favored a design featuring Lincoln, but Fraser soon developed a design featuring a Native American on one side and a bison on the other. Secretary MacVeagh wrote, "Tell him that of the three sketches which he submitted we would like to use the sketch of the head of the Indian and the sketch of the buffalo." In July 1912, news of the new nickel became public, and coin-operated machine manufacturers sought information. Clarence Hobbs of the Hobbs Manufacturing Company, maker of counterfeit detectors, feared the new nickel would not be passed by his devices. Hobbs demanded various changes to the design, to which the artist was reluctant to agree.

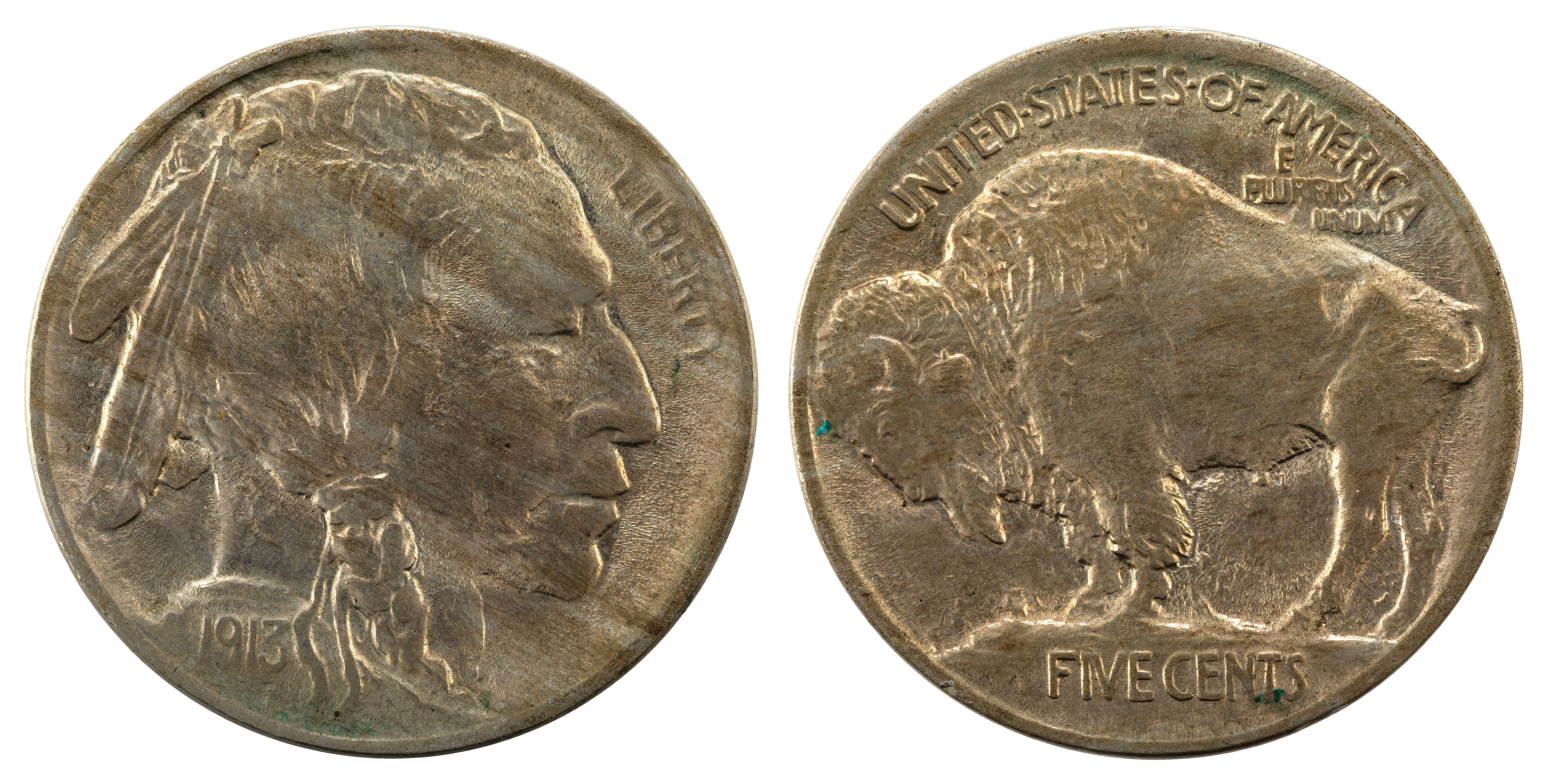
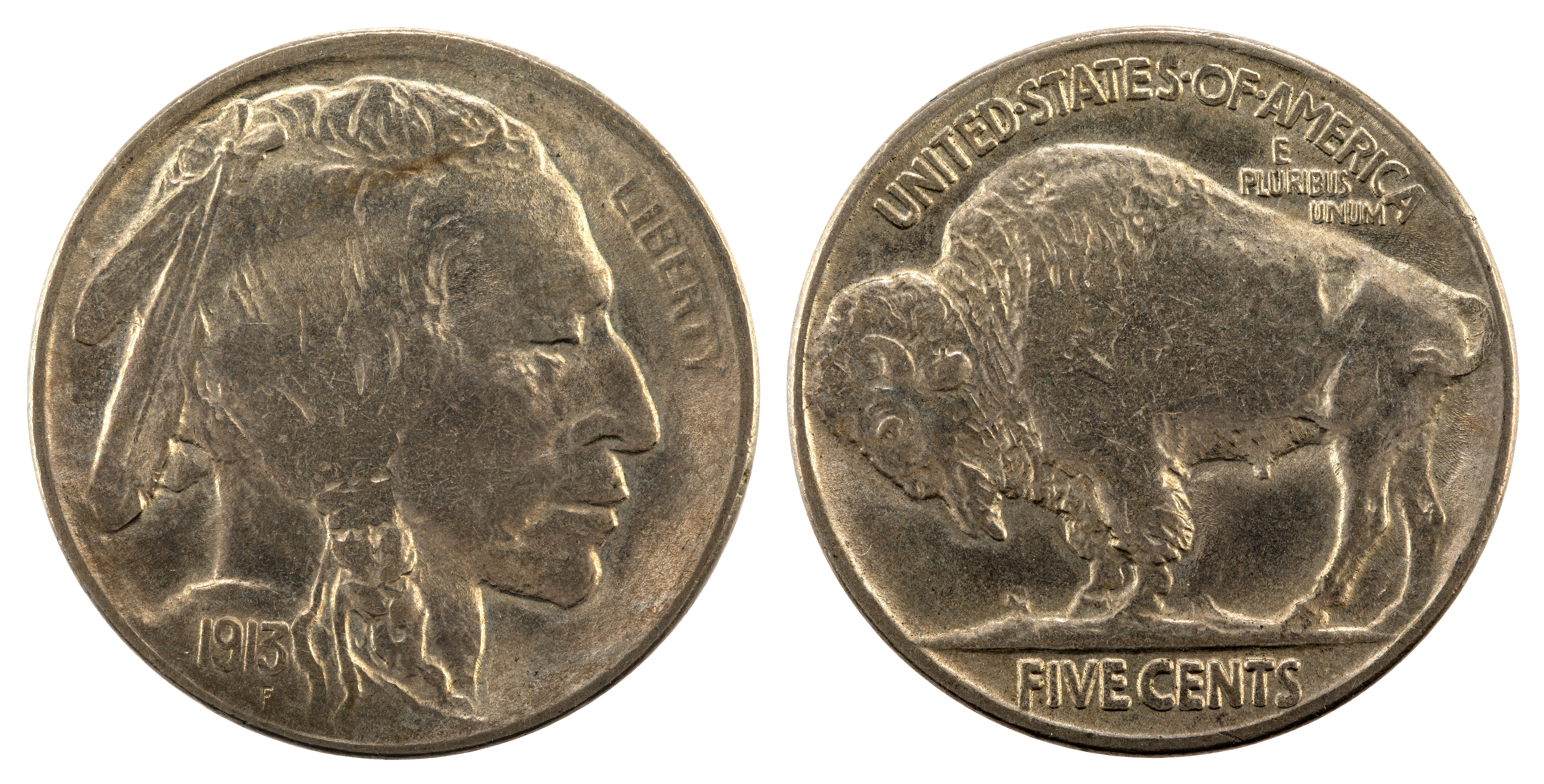
1913 Buffalo nickel (Type I & II)

The Hobbs Company continued to interpose objections in 1913. On February 3, Hobbs sent Roberts a lengthy list of changes that he wanted in the coin, and the sculptor was required to attend a conference with Hobbs representatives. On the fifth, following the conference, which ended with no agreement, Fraser sent MacVeagh a ten-page letter, complaining that his time was being wasted by the Hobbs Company, and appealing to the Secretary to bring the situation to a close. Secretary MacVeagh agreed to hold a meeting at his office in Washington on February 14. Barber prepared patterns showing what the nickel would look like if the changes demanded by Hobbs were made. MacVeagh conducted the meeting much like a legal hearing, and issued a letter the following day. The secretary noted that no other firm had complained, that the Hobbs mechanism had not been widely sold, and that the changes demanded—a clear space around the rim and the flattening of the Native American's cheekbone—would affect the artistic merit of the piece. MacVeagh concluded, "You will please, therefore, proceed with the coinage of the new nickel."

The coins were officially released to circulation on March 4, 1913, and quickly gained positive comments for depicting truly American themes. However, The New York Times stated in an editorial that "The new 'nickel' is a striking example of what a coin intended for wide circulation should not be ...[it] is not pleasing to look at when new and shiny, and will be an abomination when old and dull." The Numismatist, in March and May 1913 editorials, gave the new coin a lukewarm review, suggesting that the Native American's head be reduced in size and the bison be eliminated from the reverse.

Dies for the new design proved to break quickly. Barber made proposed revisions, which Fraser approved after being sent samples. These changes enlarged the legend "FIVE CENTS" and changed the ground on which the bison stands from a hill to flat ground. According to data compiled by numismatic historian David Lange from the National Archives, the changes to what are known as Type II nickels (with the originals Type I) actually decreased the die life. A problem not addressed was the exposure of the date to wear; many Buffalo nickels today have the date worn away.

In January 1938, the Mint announced an open competition for a new nickel design, to feature early president Thomas Jefferson on the obverse, and Jefferson's home, Monticello on the reverse. The last Buffalo nickels were struck in April 1938 at the Denver Mint, the only mint to strike them that year.

=== Design and name ===
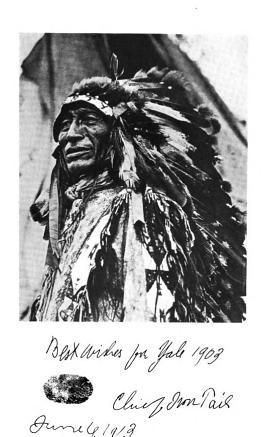
Chief Iron Tail, c. 1912

The identities of the models for the Native American on the obverse and for the bison on the reverse are not known with certainty. Fraser stressed that the Native American was a type, rather than based on a specific individual, and identified various Native Americans as models, not always consistently, including Iron Tail (Oglala Lakota), Two Moons (Northern Cheyenne), and Big Tree (of the Kiowa people). There have been other claimants, the most prominent being John Big Tree, a Seneca, who made many public appearances as the "nickel Indian" until his death in 1967. Fraser recounted that the animal on the reverse was an American bison, Black Diamond, whom he stated lived at the Bronx Zoo, and also described the model simply as a bison at the Bronx Zoo. However, Black Diamond was never at the Bronx Zoo, but instead lived at the Central Park Zoo (both facilities are in New York City) until the animal was sold and slaughtered in 1915. The placement of the horns on the still-extant mounted head of Black Diamond differs from that of the bison on the nickel.

From its inception, the coin was referred to as the "Buffalo nickel", reflecting the common name for the bison. The numismatic publication with the greatest circulation, Coin World, calls it an Indian head nickel, while R.S. Yeoman's Red Book refers to it as "Indian Head or Buffalo".

== Jefferson nickel (1938–present) ==
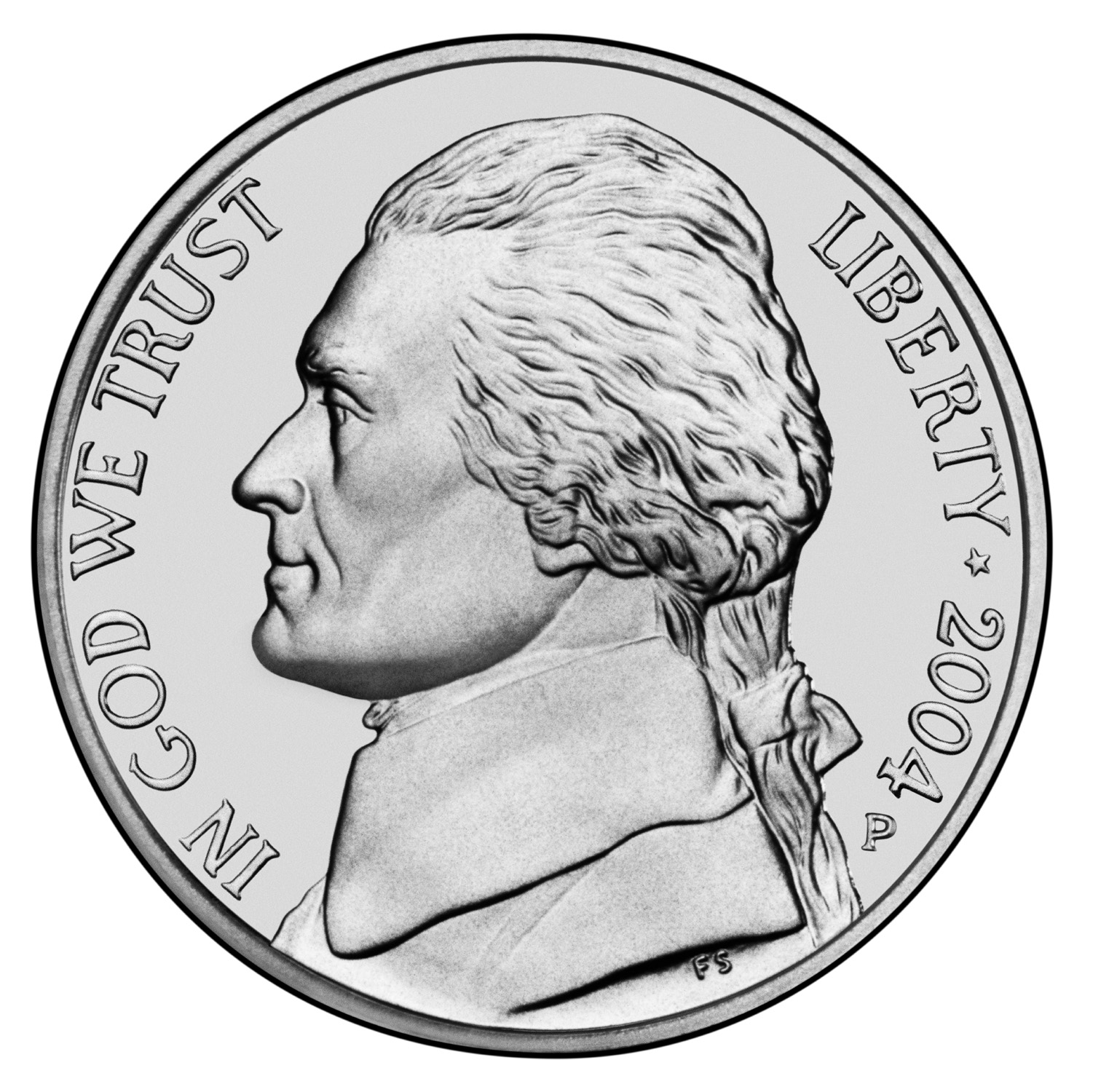
The Jefferson nickel obverse as struck from 1938 to 2004. Coins from pre-1966 lack the designer's initials.

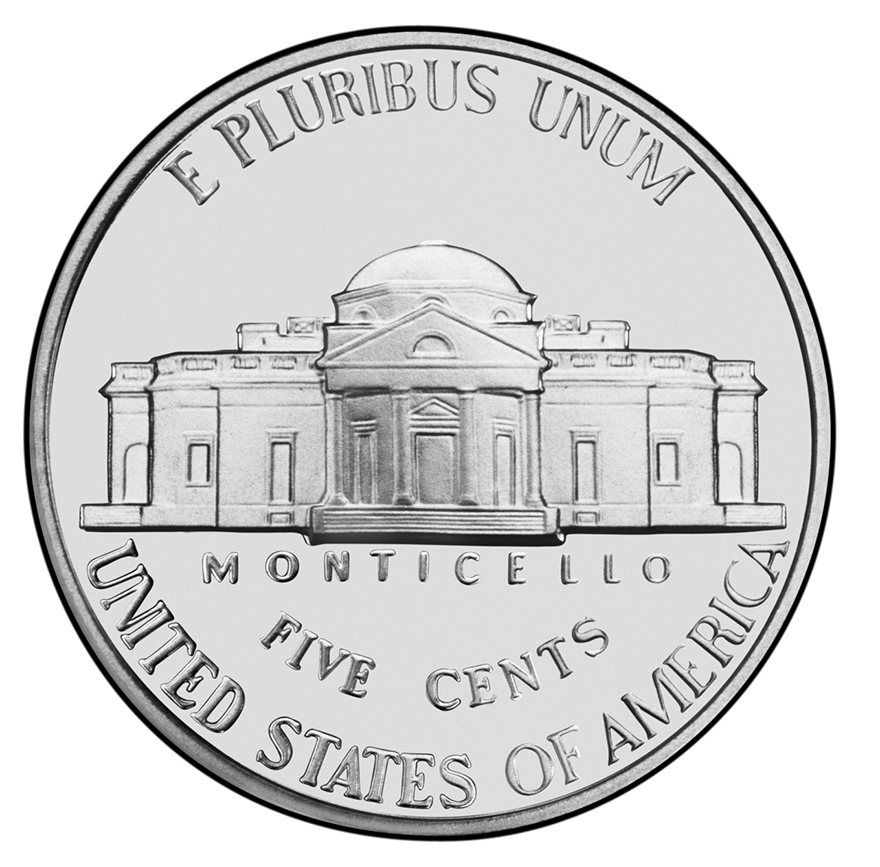
The Jefferson nickel reverse, as struck from 1938 to 2003, features Monticello, Jefferson's home.

When the Buffalo nickel had been struck for 25 years and could be replaced without an act of Congress, the Mint moved quickly to replace it. Although the Fraser design is popular today among numismatists, it did not enjoy that status in 1938, and there was no public outcry at the decision. In January 1938, the Mint announced an open competition for the new nickel design, with the winner to receive a prize of $1,000, equal to $22,872 today. Anticipating the 1943 bicentennial of Jefferson's birth, competitors were to place his portrait on the obverse, and a depiction of his house Monticello on the reverse.

On April 24, Felix Schlag was announced as the winner. His design featured the portrayal of Jefferson which would be used on the nickel until 2004, closely conforming to the former president's bust by sculptor Jean-Antoine Houdon, which is to be found in Boston's Museum of Fine Arts. However, the model differs from the nickel that was struck for circulation because it featured a view of Monticello from an angle, and a style of lettering officials did not like; Schlag was required to change both. Either through a misunderstanding or an oversight, Schlag did not include his initials in the design; they would not be added until 1966. Production began on October 3, 1938; they were released into circulation on November 15. According to contemporary accounts, the Jefferson nickel was initially hoarded, and it was not until 1940 that it was commonly seen in circulation.

With the entry of the United States into World War II, nickel became a critical war material, and the Mint sought to reduce its use of the metal. On March 27, 1942, Congress authorized a nickel made of 50% copper and 50% silver, but gave the Mint the authority to vary the proportions, or add other metals, in the public interest. The Mint's greatest concern was in finding an alloy that would use no nickel, but still satisfy counterfeit detectors in vending machines. An alloy of 56% copper, 35% silver and 9% manganese proved suitable, and this alloy began to be coined into nickels from October 1942. In the hope of making them easy to sort out and withdraw after the war, the Mint struck all "war nickels" with a large mint mark appearing above Monticello. The mint mark P for Philadelphia was the first time that mint's mark had appeared on a U.S. coin. The pre-war composition returned in 1946; all nickels struck since then have been in 75% copper and 25% nickel.

In 1966, a small change was made to the design to add the initials of the designer (FS) to the obverse, underneath Jefferson's portrait. In commemoration of that change, two specimen 1966 nickels with the initials were struck and presented to him. Coins struck at any mint between 1965 and 1967 lack mint marks, which were omitted as the Mint replaced the silver circulating coins with copper-nickel. Beginning in 1968, mint marks were again used, and on the nickel were moved to the lower part of the obverse, to the right of Jefferson's bust. From 1971, no nickels were struck for circulation in San Francisco—the 1971-S was the first nickel struck in proof only since 1878.

=== Westward Journey commemoratives (2004–2005) ===
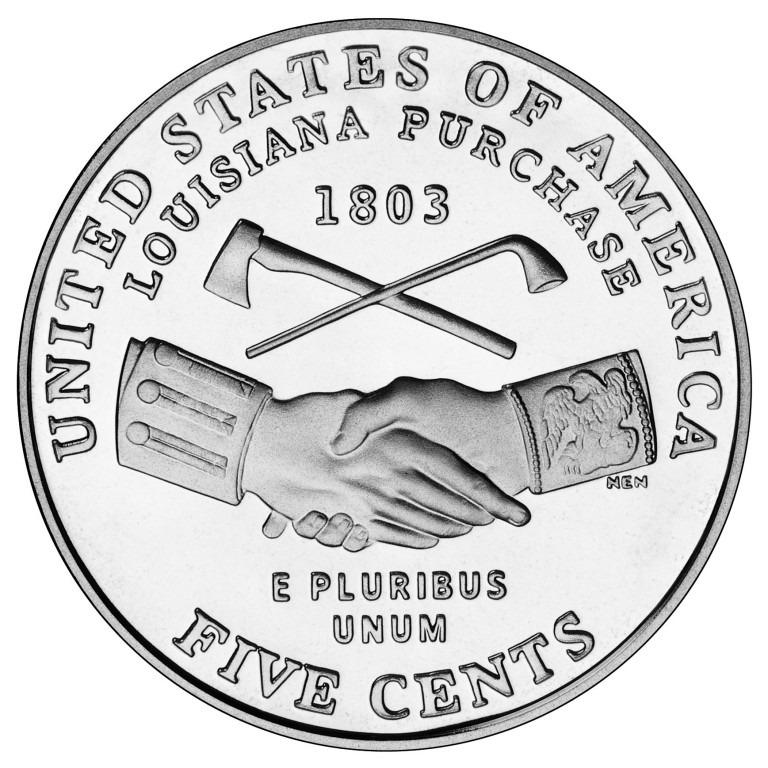
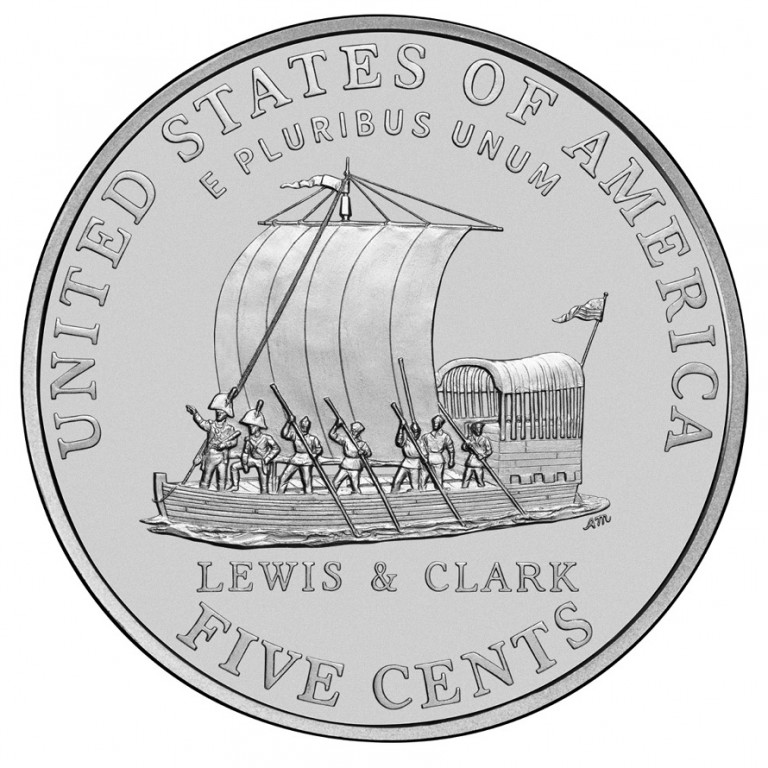
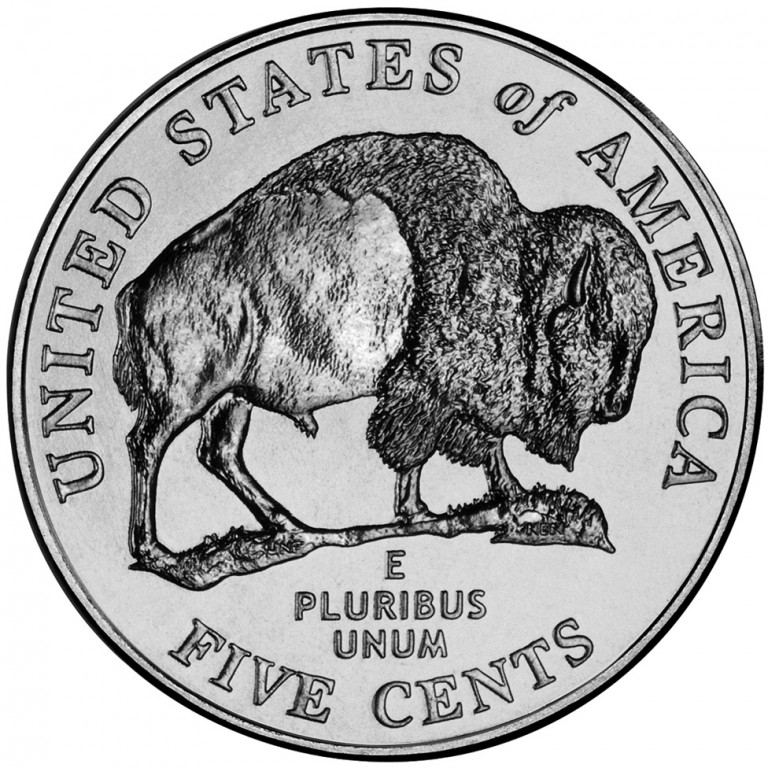
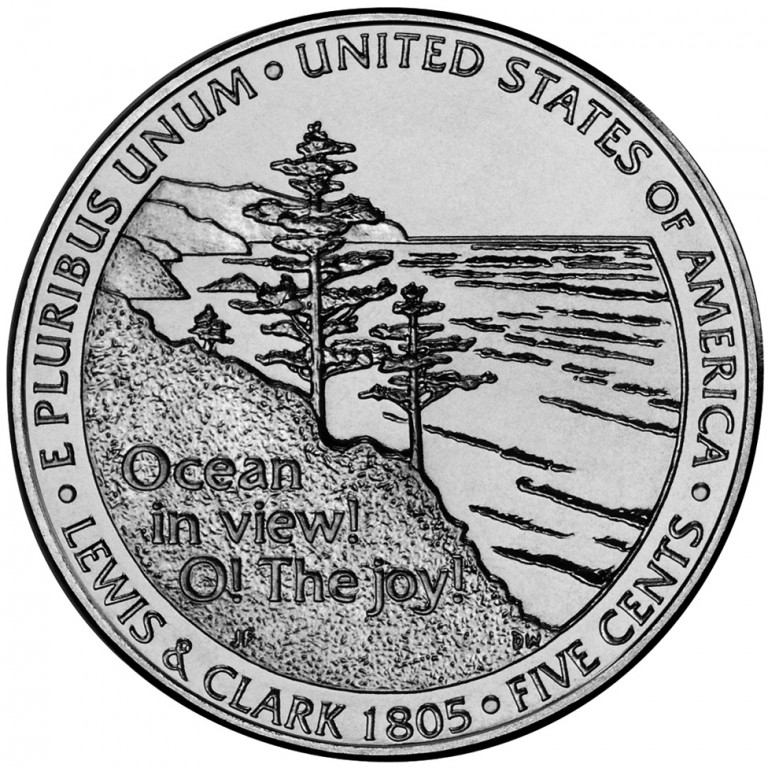
Westward Journey series reverses

The Mint had struck circulating commemorative coins for the United States Bicentennial, giving quarters, half dollars, and dollars struck in 1975 and 1976 a dual date, "1776–1976". After Canada issued a successful series of quarters in 1992 honoring its provinces and territories, the Mint obtained congressional permission to issue a series of US quarters honoring American states; they began to be issued in 1999. In 2002, the Mint began to consider redesigning the nickel in honor of the upcoming bicentennial of the Lewis and Clark Expedition. Representative Eric Cantor (R-VA) did not wish to see Monticello (located in his home state) moved permanently off the nickel. The resultant "American 5-Cent Coin Design Continuity Act of 2003", was signed into law by President George W. Bush on April 23, 2003. Under its terms, the Treasury Secretary could vary the nickel's designs in honor of the 200th anniversary of the Expedition and of the Louisiana Purchase, but the nickel would again feature Jefferson and Monticello beginning in 2006. Unless Congress acts again, every future five-cent coin will feature Jefferson and Monticello.

The Mint used Schlag's obverse in 2004, with two new reverse designs. Mint sculptor-engraver Norman E. Nemeth's adaptation of an Indian Peace Medal struck for Jefferson was the first new design, followed by a depiction by Mint sculptor-engraver Al Maletsky of a keelboat like that used by the Expedition. The 2005 obverse was struck during that year only, with a design by sculptor Joe Fitzgerald based on Houdon's bust of Jefferson. The legend "LIBERTY" on the obverse was traced from Jefferson's handwriting in drafting the Declaration of Independence; as the word is never capitalized in that document, Fitzgerald borrowed a capital L from Jefferson's other writings. The reverse for the first half of the year depicted an American bison, recalling the Buffalo nickel and designed by Jamie Franki. The reverse for the second half showed a coastline and the words "Ocean in view! O! The Joy!", from a journal entry by William Clark, co-leader of the Expedition. Clark had actually written the word as "ocian", but the Mint modernized the spelling.

Another Franki design has, since 2006, been used for the obverse, depicting a view of Jefferson from the front (rather than in profile) based on an 1800 study by Rembrandt Peale, and includes "Liberty" in Jefferson's script. According to Acting Mint Director David Lebryk, "The image of a forward-facing Jefferson is a fitting tribute to [his] vision." The reverse beginning in 2006 was again Schlag's Monticello design, but newly sharpened by Mint engravers. As Schlag's obverse design, on which his initials were placed in 1966, is no longer used, his initials were placed on the reverse to the right of Monticello.

=== Increase in metal values ===
In the first decade of the 21st century, commodity prices for copper and nickel, which make up the five-cent coin, rose dramatically, pushing the cost of manufacturing a nickel from 3.46 cents in fiscal year 2003 to 10.09 cents in fiscal year 2012. By comparison, a Canadian nickel (which is primarily made of steel) still costs less than its face value to produce as of 2019. In response, Mint Director Henrietta Fore in 2004 asked Congress to fund research into lower-cost alternatives to present coinage metals. Although the initiative lapsed when she left office in 2005, in 2010, Congress passed the Coin Modernization, Oversight, and Continuity Act (CMOCA), directing the Mint to explore alternatives to the present compositions of the six denominations, from cent to dollar. In 2011, the Mint awarded a contract to study the issue to Concurrent Technologies Corporation of Johnstown, Pennsylvania. The report in response to the legislation declared that there is no material that would reduce the one-cent coin's manufacturing cost to below one cent, so it was removed from consideration. The report requested additional time to study the issue, ensuring the continuation, for the present, of the existing coinage metals. The Mint expected demand for nickels in commerce to increase from 840 million needed in Fiscal Year 2011 to 1.08 billion in 2015.

Meanwhile, in an attempt to avoid losing large quantities of circulating nickels to melting, the United States Mint introduced new interim rules on December 14, 2006, that criminalized the melting and export of pennies (which as of 2013 cost 1.83 cents to produce) and nickels. Violators of these rules can be punished with a fine of up to $10,000, five years imprisonment, or both. The rules were finalized on April 17, 2007. The melt value of a nickel for some time was more than five cents, including nearing over one-and-a-half times its face value in May 2007. Since then, the supply and demand of the coin's composition metals have stabilized. A nickel's melt value fell below its face value from late 2008 through mid-2010, and more recently again from late mid-2012. In February 2014, it was reported that the Mint was conducting experiments to use copper-plated zinc (the same composition used for the United States 1 cent coin) for the nickel.

In December 2014, the Mint released its next Biennial report in response to the CMOCA. In it, the Mint declared that plated zinc products did not hold up to steam/wear tests and were rejected for U.S. coins other than the penny. Materials considered "feasible" for the 5-cent coin were nickel-plated steel, multi-ply-plated steel, and potentially another copper/nickel alloy, this time with ~77% copper, ~20% nickel, and ~3% manganese. Further testing was recommended to explore even less expensive alloys that would not require changes to vending machines (as the steel-based materials would require). In February 2023, the melt value of a nickel coin exceeded 135% of its face value.

== Proposals for abolition ==
Due to its low value, the inconvenience of carrying and counting, and the fact that it costs more to make than it is worth, various public figures have proposed eliminating the nickel along with the penny.

== See also ==
- Canadian nickel
- Hobo nickel
- North Carolina 1861 5 cents banknote
- Ring nickel
- United States Mint coin production
- United States nickel mintage figures

== Notes ==
=== Sources ===
- Anderson, Gordon T. (November 6, 2003). "U.S. to get two new nickels". CNN Money. Archived from the original on November 8, 2003.
- Bardes, Herbert C. (July 24, 1966). "Nickel designer gains his place". The New York Times. p. 85. (subscription required)
- Deisher, Beth (April 16, 2012). "U.S. must summon the courage to retire 1-cent denomination". Coin World. p. 15.
- Frazier, Joseph (August 5, 2005). "New nickel recalls historic moment". The Register-Guard. Eugene, Oregon. AP. p. C7.
- Gilkes, Paul (January 4, 2012). "Cent, 5¢ demand on rebound during FY2011". Coin World. p. 4.
- Gilkes, Paul (December 31, 2012). "Mint wants more time to study compositions". Coin World. p. 1.
- Orosz, Joel J. (June 2012). "The five founding fathers of the United States Mint". The Numismatist. American Numismatic Association.
- Porterfield, Walden R. (March 3, 1970). "The Billion Dollar Profile". The Milwaukee Journal. p. 16.
- "US unveils forward-looking nickel". BBC. October 6, 2005.
- "Rare U.S. coin fetches over US$3.7 million at auction". The China Post. January 1, 2010. Archived from the original on March 5, 2016.
- "Jefferson nickels". Collectors Weekly.
- "U.S. Code, Title 31, Section 5112". Cornell University Law School. Archived from the original on November 23, 2011.
- United States Mint (c. 2009). "50 States Quarters Report" (PDF). United States Mint Financial Department. Archived from the original (PDF) on March 10, 2016.
- "Nation to get newly designed nickels" (Press release). United States Mint. April 24, 2003.
- "The 2004 Westward Journey nickel series designs". United States Mint. Archived from the original on April 11, 2016.
- "The 2005 Westward Journey nickel series designs". United States Mint. Archived from the original on August 21, 2011.
- "The 2006 Westward Journey nickel series designs". United States Mint.
- "United States Mint Moves Limits Exportation & Melting of Coins" (Press release). United States Mint. April 17, 2007.
- "Va. legislators want to keep their nickel back". USA Today. AP. July 23, 2002.

=== Bibliography ===
- Bowers, Q. David (2006). A Guide Book of Shield and Liberty Head Nickels. Atlanta, Georgia: Whitman Publishing. ISBN 978-0-7948-1921-7.
- Bowers, Q. David (2007). A Guide Book of Buffalo and Jefferson Nickels. Atlanta, Georgia: Whitman Publishing. ISBN 978-0-7948-2008-4.
- Breen, Walter (1988). Walter Breen's Complete Encyclopedia of U.S. and Colonial Coins. New York, N.Y.: Doubleday. ISBN 978-0-385-14207-6. OL 4404444M.
- Burdette, Roger W. (2007). Renaissance of American Coinage, 1909–1915. Great Falls, Virginia: Seneca Mill Press. ISBN 978-0-9768986-2-7.
- Coin World Almanac (3rd ed.). Sidney, Ohio: Amos Press. 1977. ASIN B004AB7C9M.
- Hobson, Walter (1971). Historic Gold Coins of the World. Garden City, New York: Doubleday and Co. ISBN 978-0-385-08137-5.
- Lange, David W. (2006). History of the United States Mint and its Coinage. Atlanta, Georgia: Whitman Publishing. ISBN 978-0-7948-1972-9.
- Montgomery, Paul; Borckardt, Mark; Knight, Ray (2005). Million Dollar Nickel. Irvine, California: Zyrus Press. ISBN 978-0-9742371-8-3.
- Peters, Gloria; Mohon, Cynthia (1995). The Complete Guide to Shield & Liberty Head Nickels. Virginia Beach, Virginia: DLRC Press. ISBN 978-1-880731-52-9.
- Richardson, William Allen, ed. (1891). Supplement to the revised statutes of the United States. Vol. 1. Washington, D.C.: US Government Printing Office.
- Taxay, Don (1983). The U.S. Mint and Coinage (reprint of 1966 ed.). New York, New York: Sanford J. Durst Numismatic Publications. ISBN 978-0-915262-68-7.
- Yeoman, R.S. (2017). Bressett, Kenneth (ed.). A Guide Book of United States Coins 2018 (71st ed.). Atlanta, Georgia: Whitman Publishing. ISBN 978-0794845032.
