= Henry Hardy (disambiguation) =

Henry Hardy (born 1949) is a British author and editor.

Henry Hardy may also refer to:

- Henry Hardy (architect) (1830–1908), Scottish architect
- Harry Hardy (Henry Hardy, 1895–1969), footballer
- Andrew (Society of the Divine Compassion) (1869–1946), British Anglican priest and friar, birth name Henry Ernest Hardy

== See also ==
- Harry Hardy (baseball) (1875–1943), baseball player
- Henry Hardie (disambiguation)
