= Joe Fitzgerald (coin designer) =

American artist and graphic designer

- Born: Washington D.C., U.S.
- Known for: Coin design

Joe Fitzgerald (born in Washington, D.C.) is an American artist and graphic designer. He is one of two designers of the 2005 United States nickel. His design, President Jefferson with Handwritten Liberty, appears on the obverse of that coin.

Fitzgerald is a painter, who has had numerous one-man-shows. His work has also been exhibited in the U.S. State Department's Art in Embassies Program. He was one of twenty-four artists selected to create new designs under the United States Mint's Artistic Infusion Program.

Fitzgerald retired in 2005 as the chief of graphics at the National Library of Medicine in Bethesda, Maryland. While with the Library, he led or participated artistically in numerous projects and exhibitions over the years, such as the Turning the Pages series of rare-book animations and the Visible Human Project. He is also known as a public speaker. His wife, Jean Fitzgerald, has retired from her position as an archivist with the Smithsonian Institution.

He is listed in Who's Who and Who's Who in American Art.
