= Felix Schlag =

German-born American sculptor

- Born: September 4, 1891; Frankfurt, Germany
- Died: March 9, 1974 (aged 82); Owosso, Michigan, U.S.
- Burial place: Owosso, Michigan, U.S.
- Education: Academy of Fine Arts, Munich
- Occupation: Sculptor
- Known for: designer of the United States five cent coin in use from 1938 to 2004
- Notable work: Jefferson nickel
- Spouse: Anna (m. 1920)
- Children: 1 son, 2 daughters
- Parents: Karl Schlag (father); Teresa Schlag (mother)

Notes
- He moved to the United States in 1929.

Felix Oscar Schlag (September 4, 1891 – March 9, 1974) was a German-born American sculptor who was the designer of the United States five cent coin in use from 1938 to 2004.

He was born to Karl and Teresa Schlag in Frankfurt, Germany where as a young man, he served in the German army of World War I. Schlag studied sculpture at the Academy of Fine Arts, Munich. He moved to the United States in 1929.

== Career ==
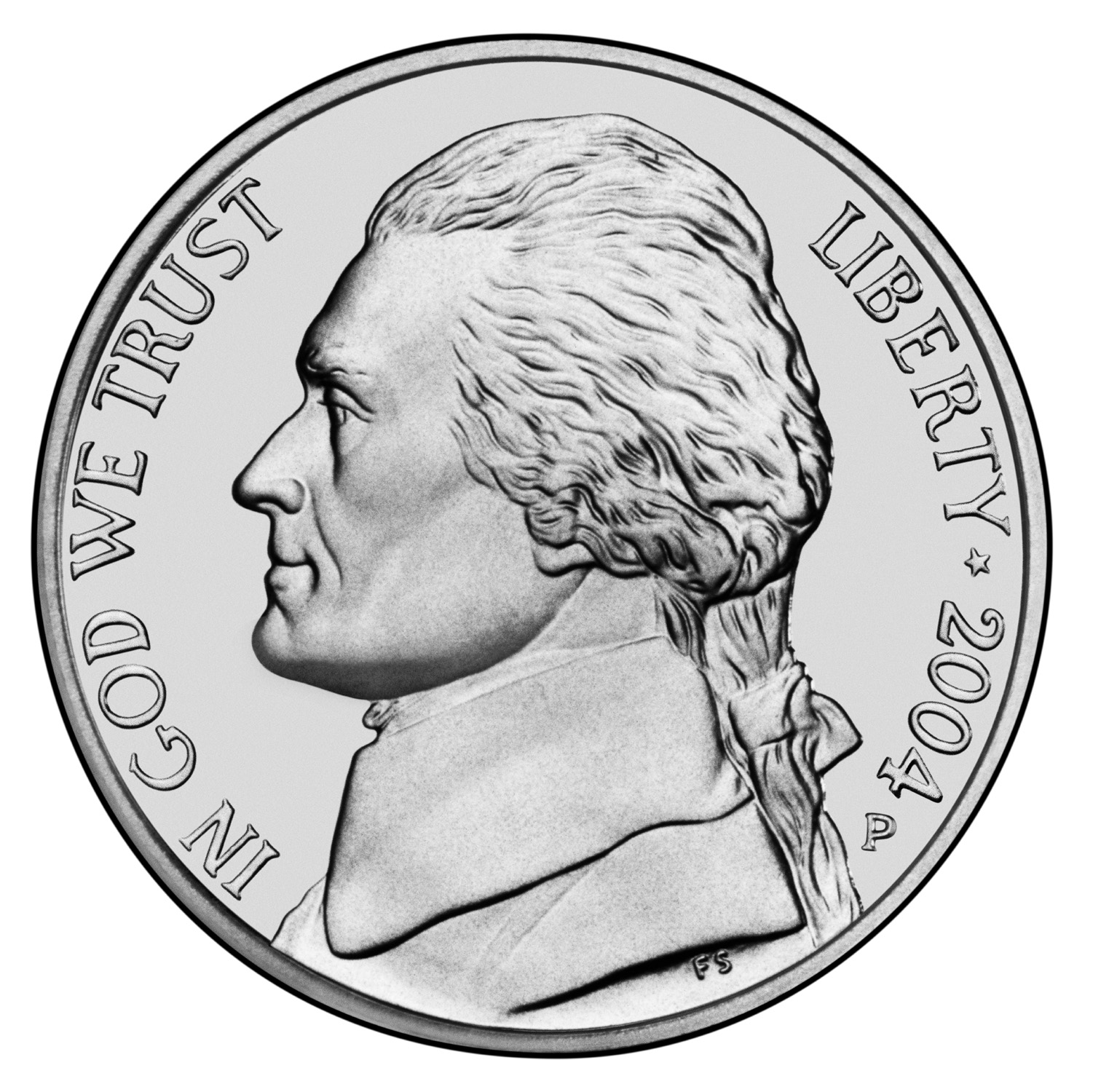
Jefferson nickel obverse

On April 21, 1938, Schlag's design for the Jefferson nickel was selected by Nellie Tayloe Ross, Director of the United States Mint. Schlag won $1,000 for his winning design of the coin; he had been an award-winning artist in Europe. His prize money was spent on his wife's funeral. In the 1930s, Felix won several sculptural commissions and art prizes including some New Deal commissions to produce work at several post offices, including ones in White Hall, Illinois and schools in Champaign, Illinois and Bloom Township.

His nickel obverse design was used from 1938 until 2004, while his reverse was used until 2003, and returned to the coin in 2006.

Schlag accepted the offer of the American government to place his initials, FS, on the nickel beginning in 1966.

== Personal life ==
The designer relocated to Owosso, Michigan, where he died and is buried. He and his wife Anna, whom he married in 1920, had three children: Feliza (1920), Leo (1921), and Hilda (1929). A memorial was placed by the Michigan State Numismatic Society on September 14, 2008.
