= North Carolina Confederate currency =

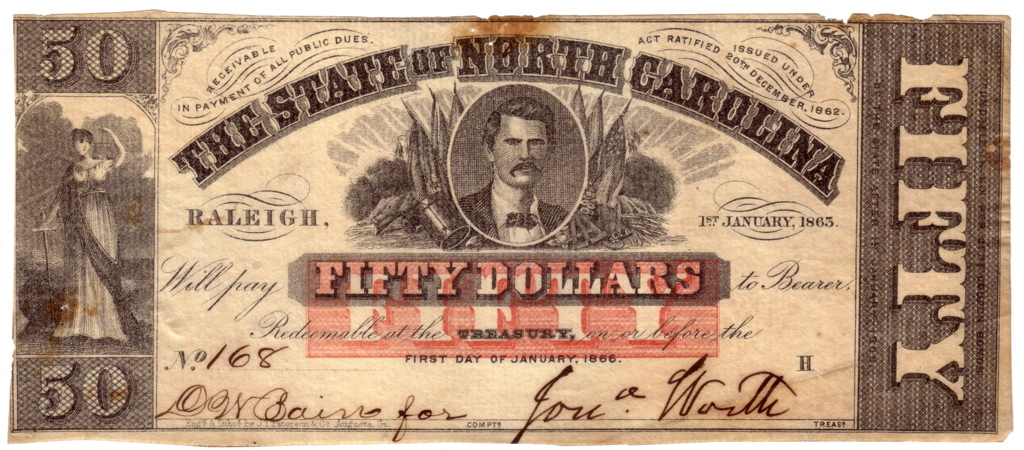
A $50 banknote from North Carolina, printed in 1863 and in circulation until 1864

The Confederate State of North Carolina issued currency during the years 1861, 1862, 1863 and 1864. The most recent state currency issue prior to this were the Colonial American banknotes issued during the 18th century. Many North Carolina banks also issued currency during this period.

Many of the North Carolina banknotes are similar to period issues from other Confederate States; this is not surprising, as the North Carolina banknotes were printed by many of the same printers that were used by other states.

It is estimated that the printing of approximately $11,350,000 in banknotes was authorized over the four-year period, but it is unknown how much was actually printed and put into circulation.

== Denominations ==
The North Carolina banknote issues are generally divided by year, and are represented by the following denominations:

=== 1861 Notes ===
- 5 cents

5 cents
(North Carolina, Confederate States of America)
- Years of printing: 1861

Obverse
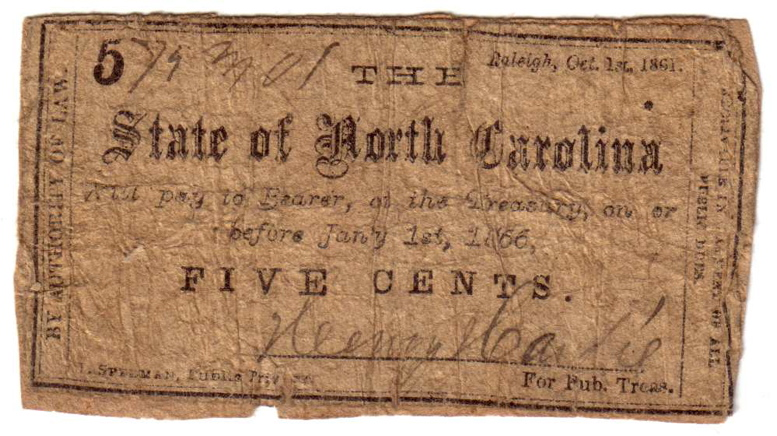

Reverse

The '5 cent bill from 1861 was among the smallest denomination bills printed during the confederacy of North Carolina. It was also one of the smallest physical bills, measuring approximately 3" by 1 5/8".. By 1863 barter was replacing currency and a tenpenny nail was used in place of this note.

==== Text on the note ====
By Authority of Law. (left margin)

Raleigh, Oct. 1st, 1861.

The
State of North Carolina
Will pay to Bearer, at the Treasury, on or
before Jan'y 1st, 1866,
FIVE CENTS.

J. Spelman, Public Printer.

(signed) For Pub. Treas.

Receivable in Payment of All Public Dues. (right margin)

==== Varieties ====
All of the 1861 North Carolina fractionals are known to exist with and without plate marks A and B (appearing above the word Carolina). Various paper and watermark combinations exist, as are bills printed on the backs of bonds and other denominations of notes.

==== Serial numbers and signatures ====
Known serial number / serial combinations include:

- 1042 A - S. H. Young
- 5289 - S. H. Young
- 79301 - Henry Hardie
- 79344 - Henry Hardie

=== Other 1861 denominations ===
- 10 cents
- 20 cents
- 25 cents
- 50 cents
- 1 dollar (NC Institute Deaf & Dumb)
- 1 dollar (No Printer)
- 2 dollars (NC Institute Deaf & Dumb)
- 2 dollars (Bornemann)

=== 1862 Notes ===
- 10 cents
- 25 cents
- 50 cents
- 1 dollar
- 5 dollars
- 10 dollars
- 20 dollars
- 50 dollars
- 100 dollars

=== 1863 Notes ===
- 5 cents
- 10 cents
- 25 cents
- 50 cents
- 75 cents
- 1 dollar
- 2 dollar
- 3 dollar
- 5 dollars
- 10 dollars
- 20 dollars
- 50 dollars

=== 1864 Notes ===
- 25 cents
- 50 cents
