= American Buffalo silver dollar =

Commemorative coin of the United States

- United States
- Value: 1 US dollar
- Mass: 26.73 g
- Diameter: 38.1 mm (1.500 in)
- Edge: Reeded
- Composition: 90% Ag, 10% Cu
- Years of minting: 2001
- Mint marks: P

Obverse
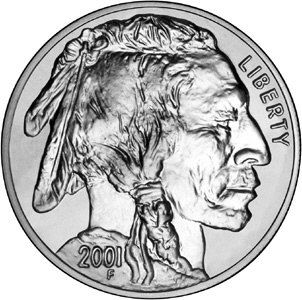
- Design: Right profile, Iron Tail and Two Moons, American Indians
- Designer: James Earle Fraser
- Design date: 1913 (original), 2001 (modified)

Reverse
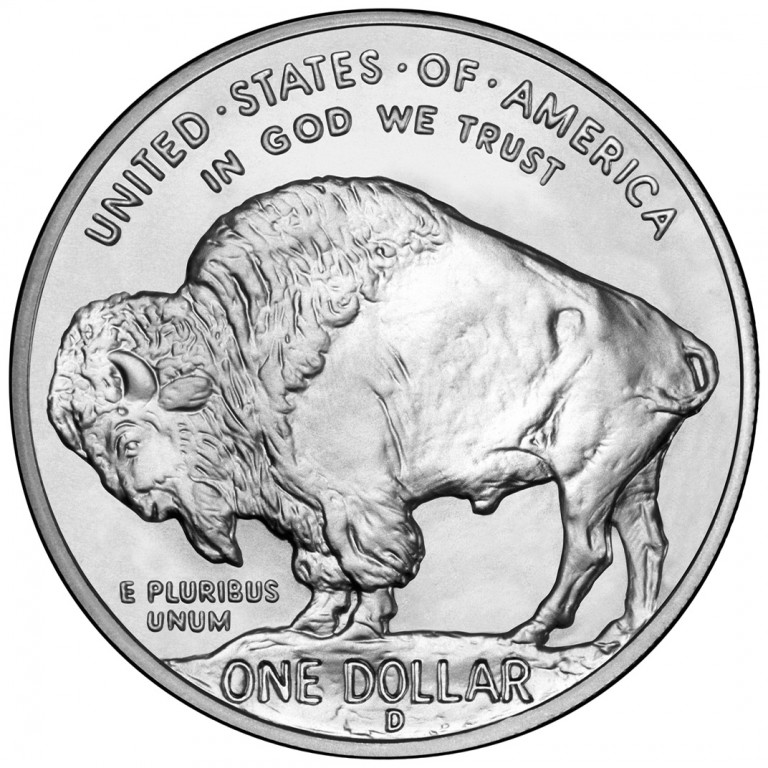
- Design: An American bison
- Designer: James Earle Fraser
- Design date: 1913 (original), 2001 (modified)

The American Buffalo silver dollar is a commemorative silver dollar issued by the United States Mint in 2001. The coin commemorates both the National Museum of the American Indian and the Buffalo nickel, the latter serving as the basis for the dollar's design. The coin was authorized by Pub. L. 106–375 (text) (PDF).

== Design ==
The design of the coin was based on the Buffalo nickel designed by James Earle Fraser in 1913. The obverse features an American Indian head that Fraser had based on the Sioux Iron Tail, the Kiowa Big Tree, and the Cheyenne Two Moons. The reverse features an American bison standing on a mound, which was based on the original Buffalo nickel reverse produced only in 1913.

== Production and sales ==
Public Law 106–375 authorized a maximum mintage of 500,000 American Buffalo dollars. The coins went on sale on June 7, 2001, and sold out just 2 weeks later on June 21. The Denver Mint produced 227,131 uncirculated coins and the Philadelphia Mint produced 272,869 proof coins. Because the coins were so popular, the National Museum of the American Indian requested an additional 250,000 or 500,000 coins to be produced, but this request was denied.

== See also ==
- American Buffalo (coin), another coin based on the Buffalo nickel
- Buffalo nickel
- List of United States commemorative coins and medals (2000s)
- United States commemorative coins
