= Walter Wetzel =

Walter Wetzel may refer to:

- Walter C. Wetzel (1919–1945), United States Army soldier and Medal of Honor recipient
- Walter S. Wetzel Sr. (1915–2003), Native American leader
