= John Two Guns White Calf =

Piegan Blackfeet chief (1872–1934)

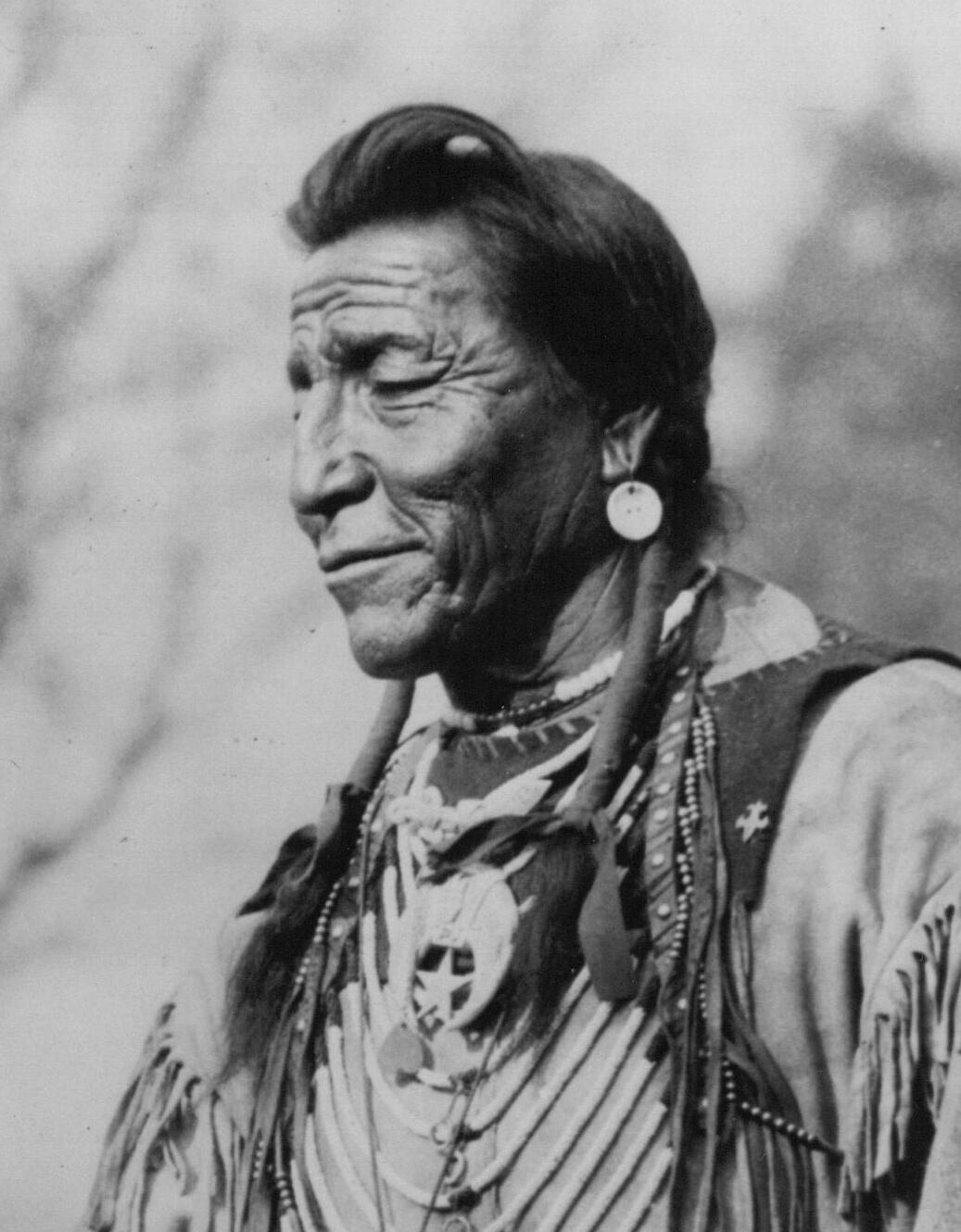
Chief Two-Guns White Calf in 1927

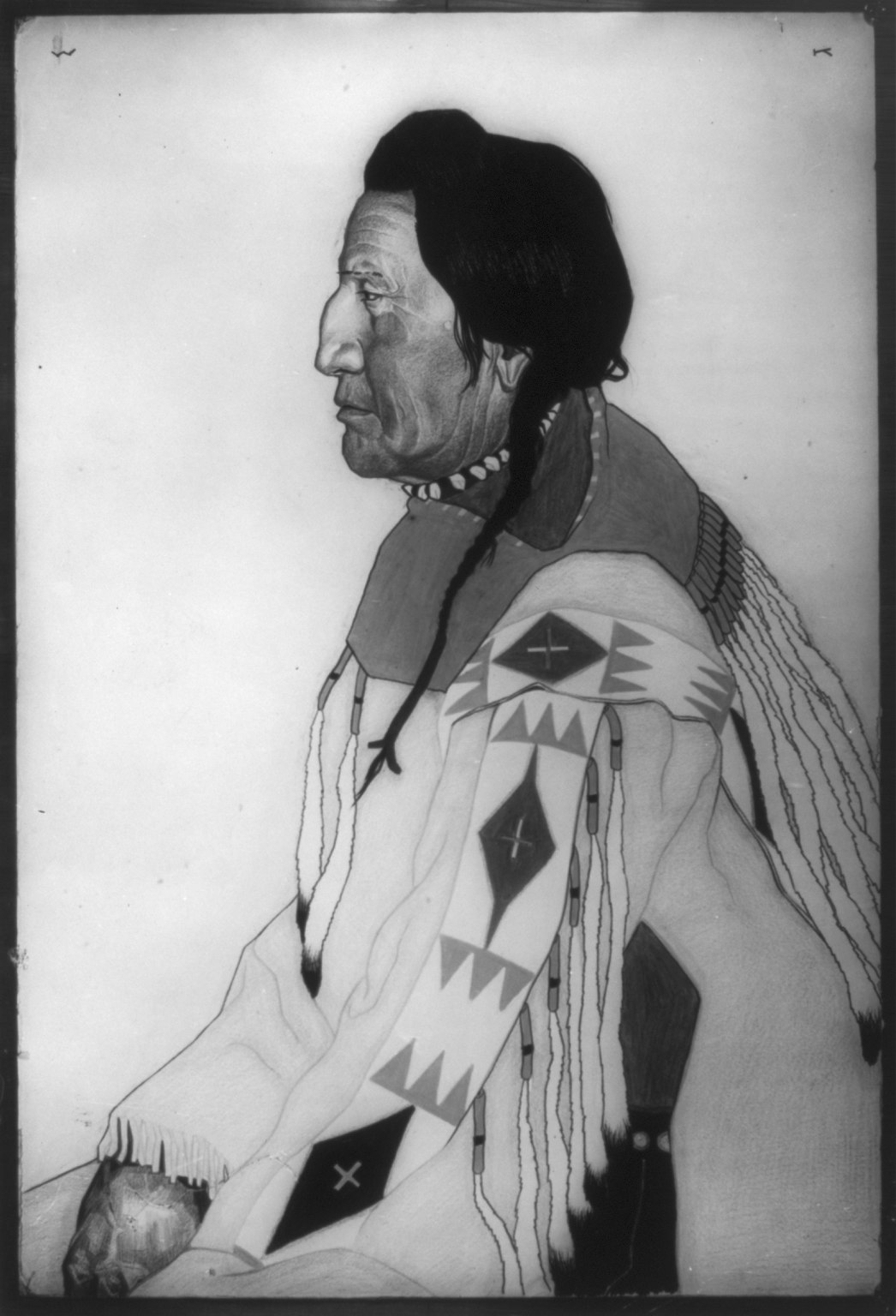
Two Guns White Calf in 1921

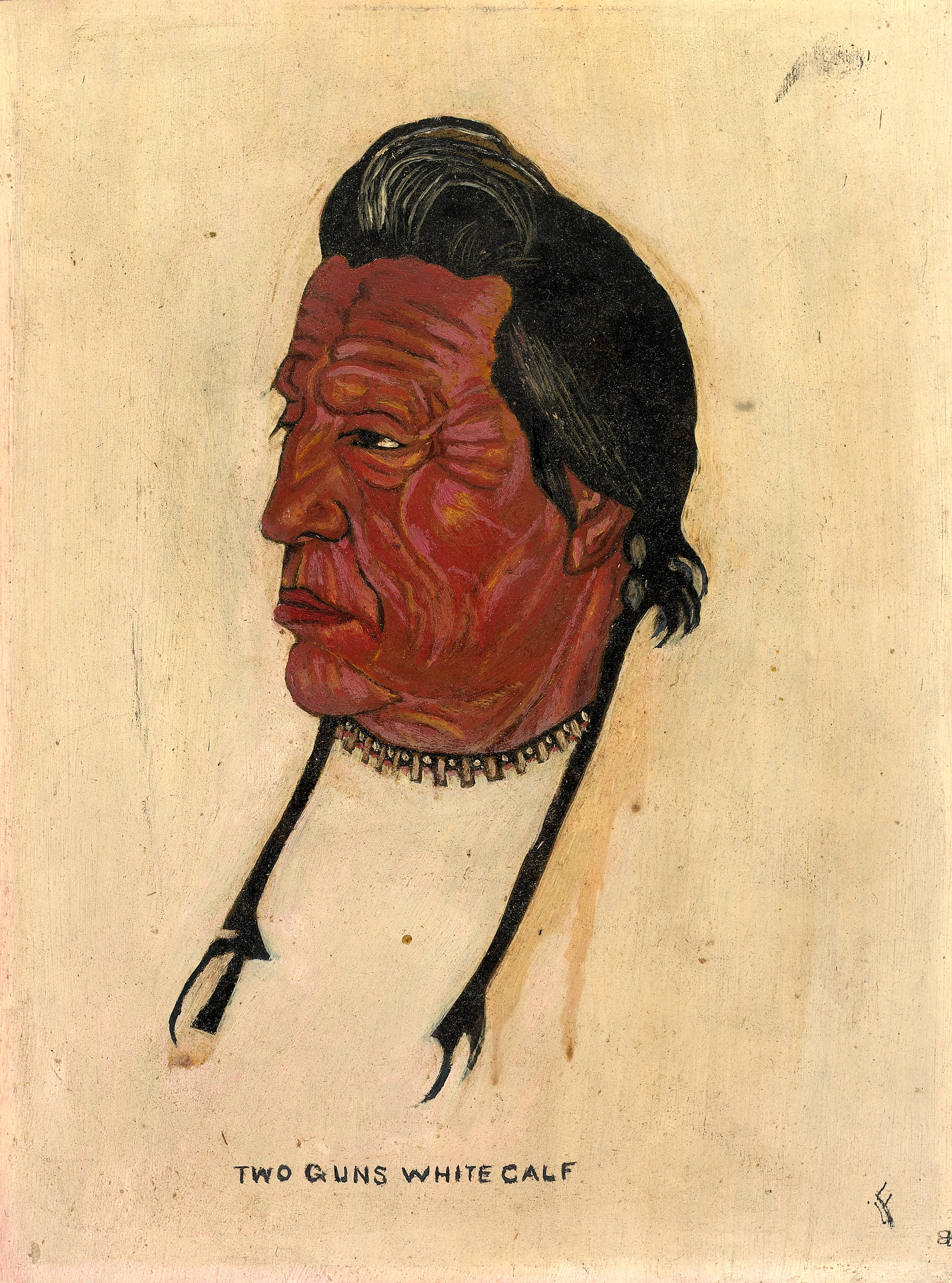
Portrait of Two Guns White Calf

John Two Guns White Calf (also known as John Two Guns and John Whitecalf Two Guns) (1872–1934) was a chief of the Piegan Blackfeet in Montana. He was born near Fort Benton, Montana, and was the adopted son of Chief White Calf. After the elder White Calf died in 1903, while a guest of President Theodore Roosevelt in Washington, D.C., White Calf became the last chief of the Blackfoot Tribe. He died from the flu at Blackfeet Indian hospital, according to the Choteau Acantha, however the Indian agency reported it was pulmonary tuberculosis that took his life at age 63. John Two Guns White Calf is buried in a Catholic cemetery in Browning, Montana.

== Promotional career ==
He became famous for his work promoting the Glacier National Park for the Great Northern Railway, as a way to encourage tourism and traffic on railways. In 1912, he traveled with several other Blackfeet to the 1912 United States Land Show in Chicago, which was possibly the first publicity trip for the tribe. He also claimed to be the model for the profile on the Indian head nickel. The sculptor, James Earle Fraser, said that the image he used was a composite of several people. Three of these speculated individuals were native chiefs of the Seneca, Cheyenne and Lakota Sioux, named Chief John Big Tree, Two Moons, and Iron Tail. It is stated that one of the possible reasons for the disapproval of John Two Guns status on the nickel, is due to the U.S. government's fear surrounding his influence on the various tribes, possibly having the ability to inspire rebellion and reclamation of land. John Two Guns White Calf also headed a secret group that went by the name "Mad Dog Society," which had the overall goal of sustaining Blackfoot heritage.

=== Washington Redskins ===
In 1971, Walter "Blackie" Wetzel, a Blackfeet tribal council member, created the Washington Redskins logo. He used Two Guns White Calf's image as the basis for the logo which was widely seen on a variety of merchandise and football gear. Due to public outcry at the derogatory nature of the word "Redskin", the logo was removed. These protests caused the team to change the logo in 2020. The team officially changed their name to The Washington Commanders in 2022. Although, some people believe that a part of history has been removed, along with the legacy and name "John Two Guns White Calf."
