= Walter S. Wetzel Sr. =

Influential Native American leader (1915–2003)

Walter “Blackie” Wetzel (1915-2003) was an influential Native American leader who served as the President of the National Congress of American Indians and Chairman of the Blackfeet Tribe. He is best known for creating the Native American mascot that was used by the Washington Commanders football team.

== Personal life ==
Wetzel was born near Cut Bank Creek on the Blackfeet Indian Reservation in the U.S. state of Montana. Walter was well known by the nickname “Blackie,” derived from his Indian name (Siks-A-Num) which means “Blackfeet Man” or “Man of the Blackfeet People.” His grandparents included a full-bloodied Blackfeet woman and a steamboat captain.

== Creation of the Washington Football Team Logo ==
After years of building relationships in Washington, D.C., Blackie worked in 1971 to convince the National Football League’s Washington Redskins team to replace their bland "R" letter with a composite image to honor Native Americans.

Blackie proposed a logo design that was a composite of Native American photographs, which included Blackfeet Chief Two Guns White Calf.

Blackie's family had mixed feelings about the Washington team changing the mascot. Some family members are attempting to get the rights to the image, as they consider it to be Blackie's intellectual property.
