= Black Diamond (buffalo) =

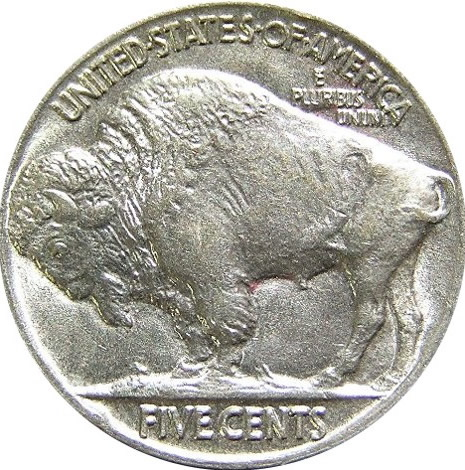
The buffalo nickel

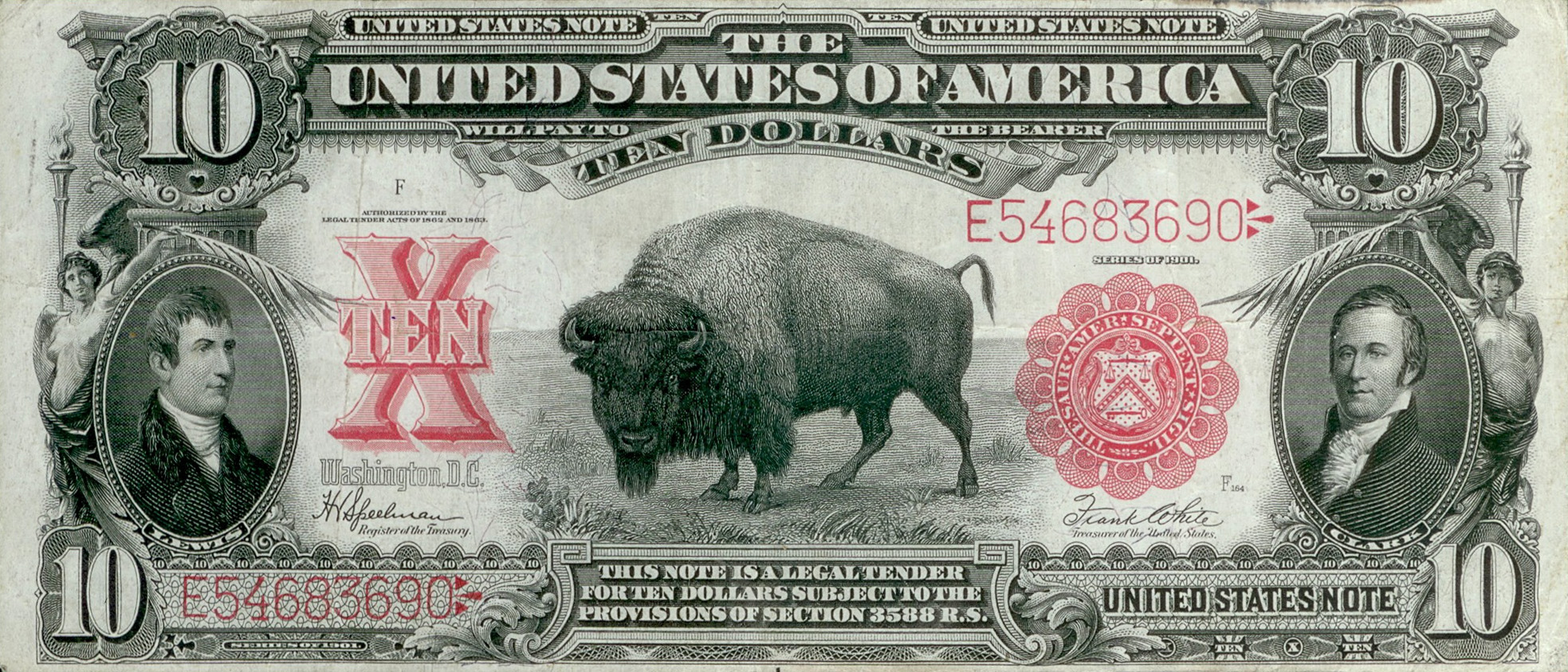
Black Diamond on the 1901 United States ten-dollar bill, drawn by Charles R. Knight

Black Diamond was a male North American bison, housed at Central Park Menagerie (Central Park Zoo). According to legend, he was the model for the United States buffalo nickel coin introduced in 1913, designed and sculpted by American sculptor James Earle Fraser in 1911.

Black Diamond was born in 1893 of a bull and cow given to the zoo by Barnum & Bailey Circus. He weighed 1550 pounds, and was a popular attraction at the zoo. Sick and disabled at age 22, Black Diamond was put up for auction 28 June 1915. However, no bids were received. He was purchased for slaughter in a private sale for $300 (equal to $9,325 today) by A. Silz, Inc., a game and poultry dealer. Multiple people had offered $1000 to save him, but to no avail. He was slaughtered on 17 November 1915, yielding 750 pounds of usable meat which was sold for $2 a pound, equal to $62.16 in today’s currency. Fred Santer, a New York taxidermist, mounted Black Diamond's head and turned its hide into a then-fashionable 13-foot automobile robe.

In the April 1952 issue of Natural History magazine, George G. Goodwin, the Associate Curator of Mammals at the American Museum of Natural History, wrote "(Black Diamond) was an excellent object for the artistic brush. ... Despite his size, he was quite docile. This virtue made him the perfect model." However, James Fraser never said that Black Diamond had been his model, and the Bureau of the Mint has doubts as to whether any specific bison was Fraser's model, their argument being that Fraser would have been well familiar with the species already.

Black Diamond is also reported to have been the model for the obverse (face) of the $10 U.S. Banknote, Series 1901.
