= Hobo nickel =

Sculptural art form using low value coins

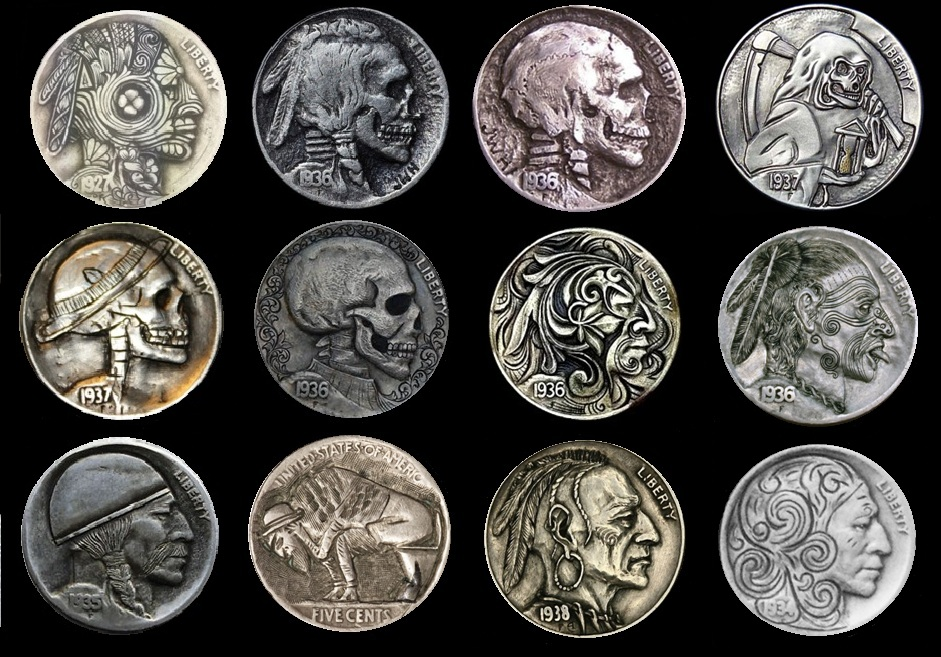
Collection of altered Buffalo nickels

The hobo nickel is a sculptural art form involving the creative modification of small-denomination coins, resulting in miniature bas reliefs. The United States nickel coin was favored because of its size, thickness, and softness; but the term hobo nickel is generic, carvings having been made from many denominations. Because of its low cost and its portability, this medium was particularly popular among hobos, hence the name.

== Early altered coins (1750s–1913) ==
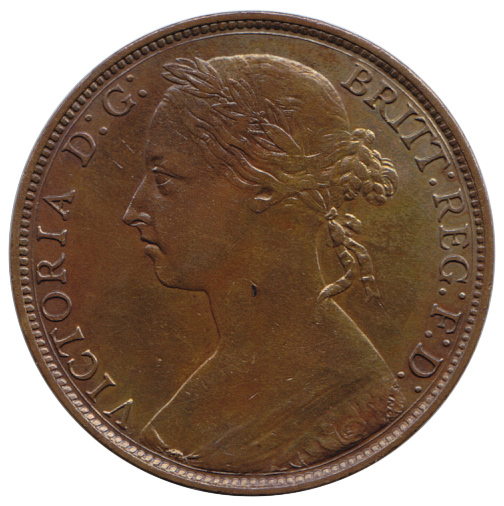
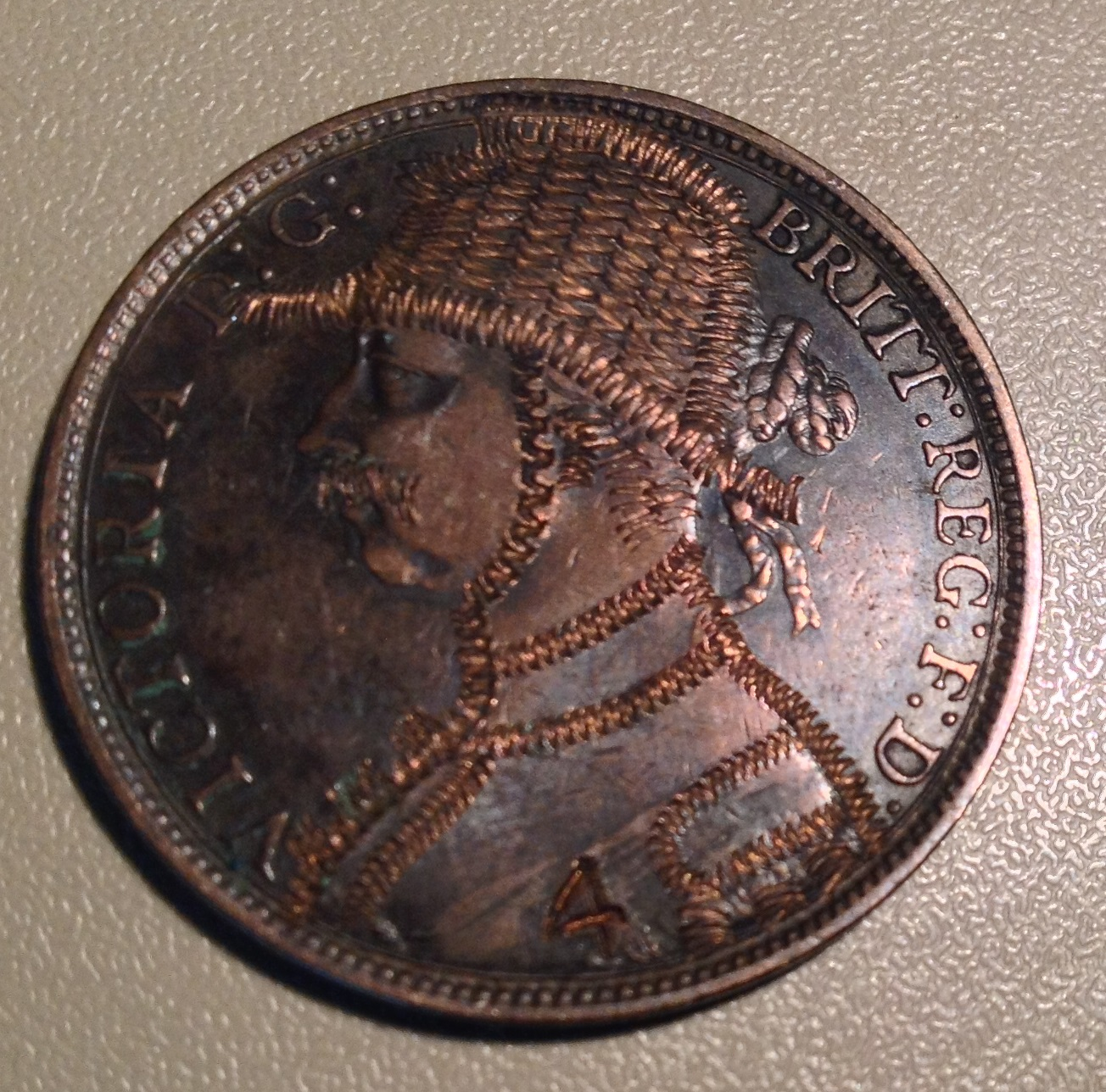
A British penny with the head of Queen Victoria (left) and an altered version showing a military general (right)

The altering of coins dates from the 18th century or earlier. Beginning in the 1850s, the most common form of coin alteration was the "potty coin", engraved on United States Seated Liberty coinage (half dime through trade dollar) and modifying Liberty into a figure sitting on a chamber pot. This period was also the heyday of the love token, which was made by machine-smoothing a coin (usually a silver one, such as a Morgan dollar) on one or both sides, then engraving it with initials, monograms, names, scenes, etc., often with an ornate border. Hundreds of thousands of coins were altered in this manner. They were often mounted on pins or incorporated into bracelets and necklaces. The love-token fad waned in the early 20th century; love tokens engraved on buffalo nickels are rare.

During this period, hobo-style coin alteration also occurred outside the United States, primarily in Britain, France, and South Africa.

== The Buffalo nickel ==
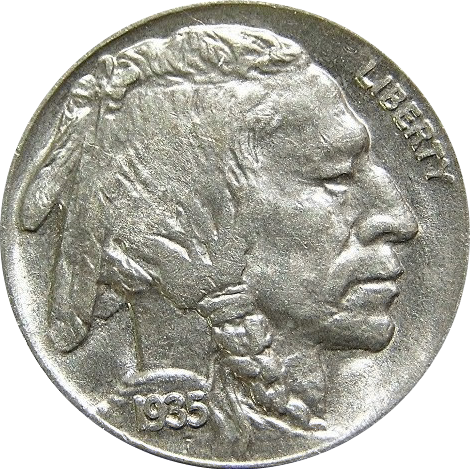
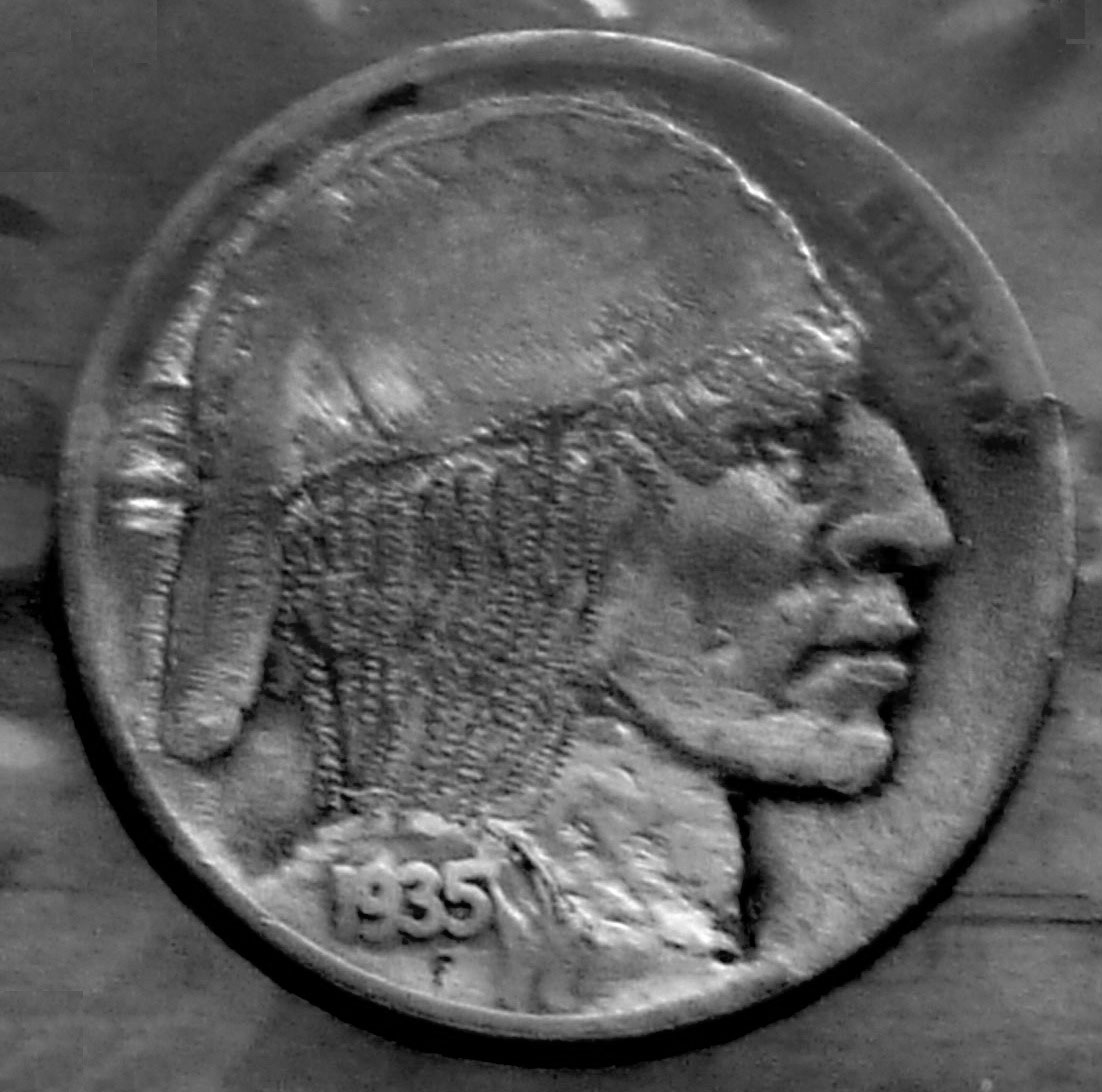
A Buffalo nickel (left) and a modified version with a baseball cap (right)

When the Indian Head nickel, or Buffalo nickel, was introduced in 1913, it became popular among coin engravers. The big Native American head was a radical departure from previous designs and would not be seen on any subsequent coins. The large, thick profile gave the artists a larger template to work on and allowed for finer detail.

On earlier coins, the head was much smaller in relation to the size of the coin. For example, on a Lincoln cent, the head covers about one sixth of the area; on the Buffalo nickel, about five sixths of the area. Moreover, the nickel is a larger coin. Large heads also adorn the Morgan dollar and the Columbian half dollar commemoratives of 1892–1893; but these coins were rarely altered, because of their high value.

Another factor contributing to the Buffalo nickel's popularity was the subject. Nearly all previous coins had depicted women (Liberty head nickels, Indian head cents, and Barber and Morgan silver dollars). A male head has larger, coarser features (nose, chin, brow), which can be altered in many ways. The buffalo on the reverse could be changed into another animal or a man with a backpack.

== Classic old hobo nickels (1913–1940) ==
Many talented coin engravers, as well as newcomers, started creating hobo nickels in 1913, when the Buffalo nickel entered circulation. This accounts for the quality and variety of engraving styles found on carved 1913 nickels. More classic old hobo nickels were made from 1913-dated nickels than any other pre-1930s date.

Many artists made hobo nickels in the 1910s and 1920s, with new artists joining in as the years went by. The 1930s saw many talented artists adopting the medium. Bertram Wiegand, known almost exclusively as Bert, began carving nickels in the teens, and his student George Washington Hughes, known as Bo, began carving in the late teens (and up to 1980 when he vanished in 1981). During this period, Buffalo nickels were the most common nickels in circulation.

== Later old hobo nickels (1940–1980) ==
The 1940s, 1950s, 1960s and 1970s were a transitional period for hobo coin engravers, during which the Buffalo nickel was gradually replaced by the Jefferson nickel. Some veteran nickel carvers such as Bo and Bert continued making hobo nickels in the classic old style. Bo, in fact, did his best work in the early 1950s, when he carved many spectacular cameo portrait hobo nickels.

During this 40-year period, many new carvers appeared, and style and subject matter became decidedly modern. Subjects became more ethnically and socially diverse (e.g., a Chinese woman with triangular hat, hippies with long hair and glasses, men wearing floppy hats, etc.). Some of these new artists used new techniques such as power engravers, vibrating tools, and felt marker pens to add color to hair.

By the end of the 1970s, most Buffalo nickels had disappeared from circulation, and the majority of engravings were performed on worn coins. Bo, for example, was forced to obtain Buffalo nickels from coin dealers, some of whom commissioned carvings.

== Modern hobo nickels (since 1980) ==
Many carvers who were active during the 1960s and 1970s continued carving Buffalo nickels into the 1980s. Their coins were altered using punches (dashes, dots, arcs, crescents, stars) and some carving of the profile. The area behind the head is usually rough from dressing with a power tool. They created standard design hobo nickels (derby and beard), as well as many modern subjects, such as occupational busts (fireman, railroad engineer, pizza chef), famous people (Uncle Sam, Albert Einstein), hippies, and others.

A major event occurred in the early 1980s, demarcating the transition from "old" to "modern" hobo nickels. This was the publication of a series of articles by numismatist Del Romines on the subject of hobo nickels. He soon published the first book on the subject, Hobo Nickels (ASIN B0006R7SFW), in 1982. Both centered on Bo and his carvings.

This resulted in some new artists entering the field, most of whom simply copied Bo's nickel artwork from the illustrations in Romines's book. The two major Bo-style copycats were John Dorusa and Frank Brazzell. Together, they produced 20,000 or more modern carved nickels, most of which were copies of Bo's designs. Dorusa even copied Bo's "GH" signature (for "George Hughes") on many of this early creations. Pressure from prominent hobo nickel collectors such as Bill Fivaz convinced Dorusa to stop carving "GH" and put his own initials or name on his works. Dorusa and Brazzell also produced original works, featuring non-traditional subject matter (conquistadors, Dick Tracy, skulls, etc.). The large number of Bo copies led many collectors to label all modern carved nickels as "Neo-Bo's", a term no longer in use.

Other carvers such as "Cinco de Arturo" (Arturo DelFavero) also appeared in the 1980s and 1990s, introducing more modern subject matter (cartoon characters, witches, and animals). Most nickel carvers of the 1980s to mid-1990s are regarded by collectors as mediocre at best, but circa 1995, Ron Landis, an engraver in Arkansas, began creating superior quality carvings. For about four years, Landis was the only nickel carver creating superior carvings, at the rate of only one to two dozen per year (all signed, numbered, and dated). Many other professional engravers have since begun creating hobo nickels. Landis and "Cinco de Arturo" are two of four known living artists practicing this craft prior to the year 2000. The others are Sonny Carpenter, and Bill Jameson (Billzach), All four are considered superior carvers, and ground breakers that inspired the current renaissance.

Some current prolific carvers are converting from quantity to quality, making fewer pieces of high artistic quality (as the market is flooded with lower quality quickly-made carvings). Modern carvings of superior quality sell for about the same prices as classic old original carvings of equal quality by unknown artists.

From the early 1980s to the present, modern lesser-quality carvings could and still can be purchased for as little as $5 to $10 each. Many new collectors found it hard to obtain good-quality old original hobo nickels (as they are so scarce and costly), so they began collecting the readily obtainable and inexpensive modern works.

About 100,000 (and possibly as many as 200,000) classic hobo nickels were created from 1913 to 1980. Modern artists have created (and continue to create) altered nickels in such large quantities that, within the next few years, the number of modern carvings is expected to surpass that of classic old hobo nickels. Most of the 100,000-plus classic old hobo nickels are not yet in the hands of collectors, whereas almost all modern carvings are. Among numismatists, the modern carvings already greatly outnumber the classic old hobo nickels.

== See also ==
- Trench art
- Elongated coin
