= Two Moons =

Indigenous American chief

- Éše'he Ôhnéšesêstse
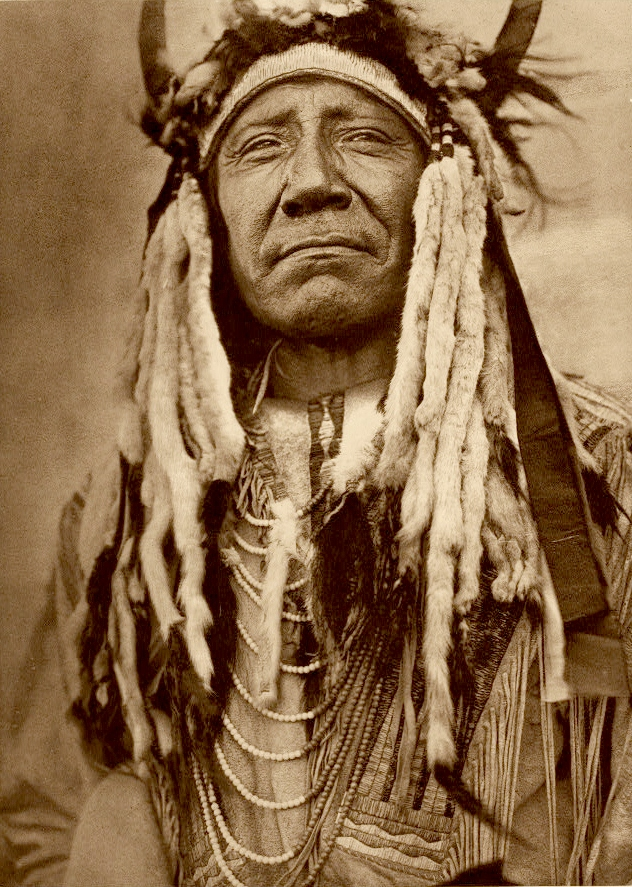
- Two Moons (Credit: Northwestern University Library Edward S. Curtis's The North American Indian, 2003).

Cheyenne leader

Personal details
- Born: c. 1847 Montana
- Died: 1917
- Resting place: Alongside U.S. Route 212, west of Busby, Montana
- Parent(s): Father, Carries the Otter
- Known for: Participation in the Battle of the Rosebud, Battle of Little Big Horn, and the Battle of Wolf Mountain; Indian Scout; Chief of the Northern Cheyenne Indian Reservation; One of three models for the Buffalo nickel.

Two Moons (c. 1847–1917), or Ishaynishus (Cheyenne: Éše'he Ôhnéšesêstse), was one of the Cheyenne chiefs who took part in the Battle of the Little Bighorn and other battles against the United States Army.

== Life ==
Two Moons was the son of Carries the Otter, an Arikara captive who married into the Cheyenne tribe. Perhaps known best for his participation in battles such as the Battle of the Rosebud against General Crook on June 17, 1876, in the Montana Territory, the Battle of Little Big Horn on June 25, 1876 and what would prove to be his last battle, the Battle of Wolf Mountain on January 8, 1877. Two Moons' defeat at Wolf Mountain by General Nelson A. Miles led inevitably to the surrender of his Cheyenne band to Miles at Fort Keogh in April 1877.

After the surrender of his Cheyenne band, Two Moons enlisted as an Indian Scout under General Miles. As a result of Two Moons' pleasant personality, the friendliness that he showed towards the whites, as well as his ability to get along with the military, General Miles appointed him head Chief of the Cheyenne Northern Reservation. As head Chief, Two Moons played a crucial role in the surrender of Chief Little Cow's Cheyenne band at Fort Keogh.

== Northern Cheyenne Reservation ==
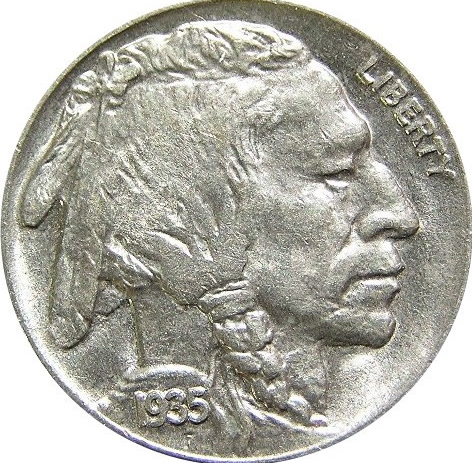
Two Moons was one of the models for the Buffalo nickel.

Two Moons traveled on multiple occasions to Washington, D.C., to discuss and fight for the future of the Northern Cheyenne people and to better the conditions that existed on the reservation. In 1914, Two Moons met with President Woodrow Wilson to discuss these matters.

Two Moons was one of the three models, along with Iron Tail, selected for James Fraser's famous Buffalo Nickel (1913–1938).

A park in Yellowstone County, Montana along the Yellowstone River is named in Two Moons honor.

== Death ==
Two Moons died in 1917 at his home in Montana at the age of 70. Two Moons' grave lies alongside U.S. Route 212, west of Busby, Montana.

== See also ==
- American Buffalo silver dollar
- American Buffalo (coin)
