= American Buffalo (coin) =

US $50 coin containing 1oz pure gold

$50
- United States
- Value: 50 U.S. dollars
- Mass: 31.108 g (1.0001 troy oz)
- Diameter: 32.7 mm (1.287 in)
- Thickness: 2.95 mm (0.116 in)
- Edge: Reeded
- Composition: 99.99% (24K) gold
- Years of minting: 2006–present
- Catalog number: BA6

Obverse
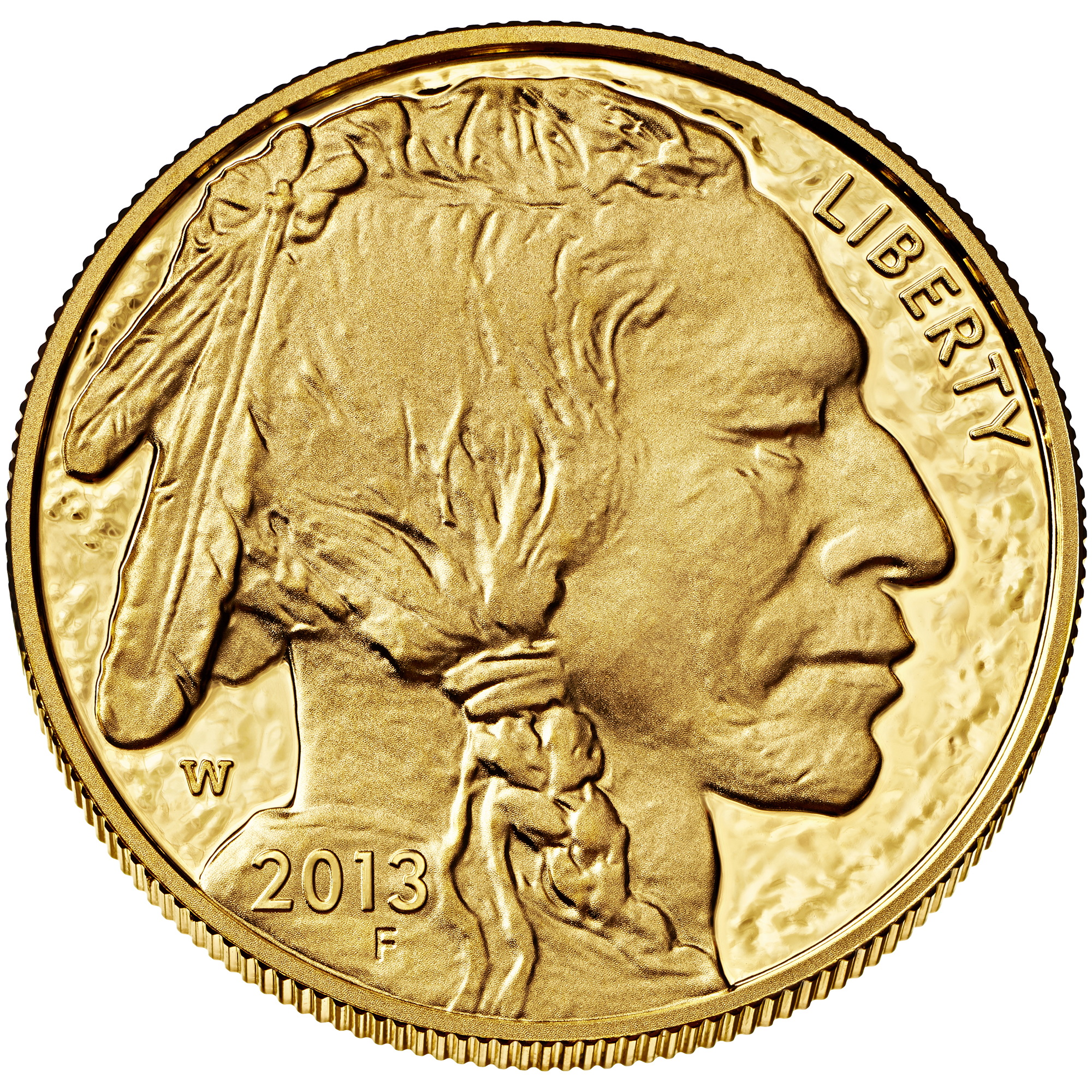
- Design: Iron Tail and Two Moons, American Indians
- Designer: James Earle Fraser's design of the Indian Head nickel was modified for the American Buffalo coin
- Design date: 1913

Reverse
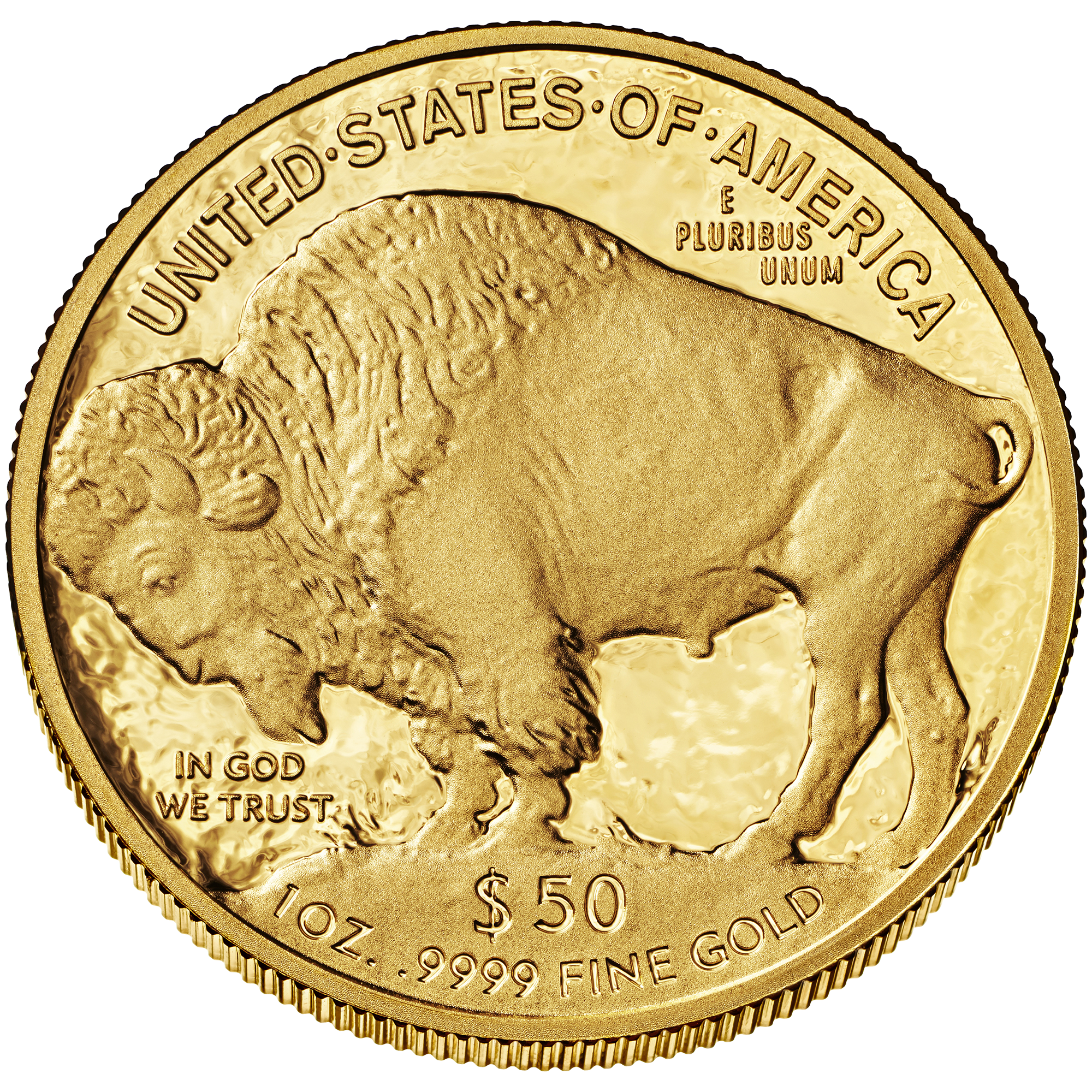
- Design: American bison
- Designer: James Earle Fraser's design of the Indian Head nickel was modified for the American Buffalo coin
- Design date: 1913

The American Buffalo, also known as a gold buffalo, is a 24-karat bullion coin first offered for sale by the United States Mint in 2006. The coin follows the design of the Indian Head nickel and has gained its nickname from the American Bison on the reverse side of the design. This was the first time the United States government minted pure (.9999) 24-karat gold coins for the public. The coin contains one troy ounce (31.1g) of pure gold and has a legal tender (face) value of US$50. Due to a combination of the coin's popularity and the increase in the price of gold, the coin's value has increased considerably. The initial 2006 U.S. Mint price of the proof coin was $800. In 2007 the price was $899.95, $1,410 in 2009, $2,010 in 2011, and $3,590 in 2024.

In addition to requiring a presidential dollar coin series to begin in 2007 and redesigning the cent in 2009, the Presidential $1 Coin Act of 2005 mandated the production of a one-ounce 24-karat gold bullion coin with a face value of $50 and a mintage limit of up to 300,000 coins.

== Design ==
The design of the American Buffalo gold bullion coin is a modified version of James Earle Fraser's design for the Indian Head nickel (Type 1), issued in early 1913. After a raised mound of dirt below the animal on the reverse was reduced, the Type 2 variation continued to be minted for the rest of 1913 and every year until 1938, except for 1922, 1932, and 1933 when no nickels were struck. Generally, Fraser's Indian Head nickel design is regarded as among the best designs of any U.S. coins. The same design also was used on the 2001 Smithsonian commemorative coin.

The obverse (front) of the coin depicts a Native American, whom Fraser said he created as a mixture of the features of three chiefs from different American Indian tribes, Big Tree, Iron Tail, and Two Moons, who posed as models for him to sketch. The obverse also shows the motto "LIBERTY" on the top right, the year of mintage on the bottom left, and below that the letter F for Fraser.

The American Buffalo gold bullion coin further has in common with the nickel the motto E PLURIBUS UNUM above the buffalo's lower back and the device UNITED·STATES·OF·AMERICA along the top. Differences that can be noted between the nickel and the fifty dollar piece are, on the gold American Buffalo coin the mound area of the reverse of the Indian Head nickel bearing the words, FIVE CENTS, has been changed to read $50 1 OZ. .9999 FINE GOLD. Also, the motto, IN GOD WE TRUST, appearing on all U.S. gold coins since 1908, can be seen on the reverse of the newer coin to the left of, and beneath, the buffalo's head.

=== Fractional sizes ===
The U.S. Mint indicated an expansion of the program, to include buffalo gold coins in fractional sizes for 2008 only. The specially-packaged 8–8-08 Double Prosperity set contained a one-half ounce gold buffalo coin.
Weights and measures provided below:

	Diameter	Thickness	Weight
$5 (1/10 oz.)	16.5 mm (0.650 in.)	1.19 mm (0.047 in.)	0.10 Troy oz. (3.11 g, 0.109 oz.)
$10 (1/4 oz.)	22.0 mm (0.866 in.)	1.83 mm (0.072 in.)	0.25 Troy oz. (7.776 g, 0.274 oz.)
$25 (1/2 oz.)	27.0 mm (1.063 in.)	2.24 mm (0.088 in.)	0.503 Troy oz. (15.552 g, 0.5485 oz.)

== Distribution ==
All U.S. bullion coins, including the American Buffalo gold piece, are being struck at the West Point Mint in New York. According to the U.S. Mint website, only the proof version of the buffalo gold coin bears the mint mark "W" on the obverse (front) of the coin, behind the neck of the Indian; the bullion version does not have the "W" mint mark. The 2006 and 2007 coins only have been issued in a one-ounce version, but in 2008, $5, $10, and $25 face value coins were minted with 1/10 oz, 1/4 oz, and 1/2 oz of gold respectively.

After a long wait by both collectors and investors, the uncirculated version of the American Buffalo gold piece was made available to coin dealers on June 20, 2006. Collectors who wanted to purchase the proof version from the mint were given the opportunity to place their orders with the mint beginning on July 22. The 2006 proof quality coin has a strict mintage limit of 300,000, with an additional enforced limit of only ten (10) coins per household. The catalog number of the 2006 proof coin at the U.S. Mint is (BA6).

The coin was created in order to compete with foreign 24-karat gold bullion coins. Since investors often prefer 99.99% pure gold over the 91.67% gold used in the American Gold Eagle, many were choosing non-U.S. coins, such as the Canadian Gold Maple Leaf, to meet their bullion needs. With the American Buffalo coin, the U.S. government hopes to increase the amount of U.S. gold sales and cash in on the 24-karat sales, which makes up about 60% of the world gold market.

On September 26, 2008, the U.S. Mint announced that, temporarily, it would halt sales of the American Buffalo coins because it could not keep up with soaring demand as investors sought the perceived safety of gold amid the subprime mortgage crisis of the late 2000s, which had also affected the price of gold.

== Mintage ==
Bullion Mintage for the bullion version of the $50 American Buffalo is as follows (all 1 ounce coins):

Year	Mintage
2024	144,500 (as of October 2025)
2023	387,000
2022	410,000
2021	350,500
2020	242,000
2019	61,500
2018	121,500
2017	99,500
2016	219,500
2015	220,500
2014	180,500
2013	198,500
2012	100,000
2011	250,000
2010	209,000
2009	200,000
2008	189,500
2007	136,503
2006	337,012

Proof Mintage for the proof version of the $50 American Buffalo is as follows (all 1 ounce coins):

Year	Mintage
2024	10,075
2023	14,007
2022	15,943
2021	16,958
2020	11,887
2019	14,844
2018	15,756
2017	15,810
2016	21,878
2015	16,591
2014	20,557
2013	18,584
2012	19,715
2011	28,683
2010	49,263
2009	49,306
2008	18,863
2007	58,998
2006	246,267

Reverse Proof Mintage for the reverse proof version of the $50 American Buffalo is as follows (all 1 ounce coins):

Year	Mintage
2013	47,836

Fractional Burnished Uncirculated Mintage for the fractional burnished uncirculated versions of the $5, $10, $25 American Buffalo is as follows (1/10, 1/4. 1/2 ounce coins respectively):

Year	Type	Mintage
2008	$5	17,429
2008	$10	9,949
2008	$25	16,908

Fractional Proof Mintage for the fractional Proof versions of the $5, $10, $25 American Buffalo is as follows (1/10, 1/4. 1/2 ounce coins respectively):

Year	Type	Mintage
2008	$5	18,884
2008	$10	13,125
2008	$25	12,169

== See also ==
- American Eagle bullion coins
- American Buffalo (1975 play), in which three criminals conspire to steal a valuable Indian Head nickel American coin
- Bullion
- Inflation hedge
